Adam is a common masculine given name in the English language, of Hebrew origin.

The name derives from the Hebrew noun adamah, meaning "the ground" or "earth". Its Biblical and Quranic uses have ensured that it is a common name in countries which draw on these traditions, and it is particularly common in Christian and Muslim majority countries. In most languages, its spelling is the same, although the pronunciation varies somewhat. Adán and Adão are the Spanish and Portuguese forms, respectively.

Adam is also a surname in many countries, although it is not as common in English as its derivative Adams (sometimes spelled Addams). In other languages, there are similar surnames derived from Adam, such as Adamo, Adamov, Adamowicz, Adamski, etc.

In Arabic, Adam means "made from earth's mud".

Translations 
 Albanian: Adam, Adham, Adem
 Arabic:  (Adam)
 Armenian: Ադամ (Adam)
 Belarusian: Адам (Adam)
 Bulgarian: Адам (Adam)
 Chinese Simplified: 亚当 (Yàdāng)
 Chinese Traditional: 亞當 (Yàdāng)
 Croatian: Adam
 Czech: Adam
 Dutch: Adam
 Esperanto: Adamo
 French: Adam
 German: Adam
 Greek: Αδάμ (Adám) 
 Gujarati: આદમ (Ādama)
 Hebrew: אדם (Adam)
 Hindi: आदम (Ādam)
 Hmong: Adas
 Hungarian: Ádám
 Italian: Adamo
 Japanese: アダム (Adamu)
 Kannada: ಆಡಮ್ (Āḍam)
 Korean: 아담, 에덤 (Adam)
 Lao: ອາດາມ (Adam)
 Latin: Adamus
 Malayalam: അദം
 Māori: Arama
 Mongolian: Адам (Adam)
 
 Persian: آدم (Ādam)
 Polish: Adam
 Portuguese: Adão
 Punjabi: ਆਦਮ (Ādama)
 Russian: Адам (Adam) 
 Serbian: Adam, Adem
 Scottish: Adam
 Slovak: Adam
 Slovene: Adam
 Somali: Aden
 Spanish: Adán
 Swahili: Adamu
 Tamil: ஆதாம் (Ātām)
 Telugu: ఆదాము (Ādaamu) 
 Thai: อาดัม (Xādạm)
 Turkish: Adem
 Ukrainian: Адам
 Uzbek: Odam
 Vietnamese: Á Đàm
 Yiddish: Adi or Odem אדם אָדער אָדעם
 Yoruba: Ádámu

People with the given name Adam

A 

 Adam, the first man, according to many religions
 Adamu (fl. c. 2400–2375 BCE), early Assyrian king
 Adam, Earl of Angus (fl. 1189), Scottish nobleman
 Adam of Bremen, 11th-century German chronicler
 Adam Philippe, Comte de Custine (1740–1793), French general
 Adam of Dryburgh (c. 1140 – c. 1212), Anglo-Scottish theologian and Carthusian monk
 Adam of Ebrach (died 1161), German abbot and historian
 Adam of Melrose (died 1222), Bishop of Caithness
 Adam (monk), East Syriac Christian monk
 Adam (bishop of Ourense) (died 1173/74), Spanish clergy
 Adam, Count of Schwarzenberg (1583–1641), Brandenburg official during the Thirty Years' War
 Adam the Welshman (c. 1130–1181), Welsh theologian and Bishop of St Asaph
 Adam (murder victim) (c. 1990–2001), name given to the victim of an unsolved Thames murder case
 Adam Abeddou (born 1996), French footballer
 Adam Abell (c. 1480 – c. 1540), Scottish chronicler, friar at Jedburgh Abbey
 Adam Abraham von Gaffron und Oberstradam (1665–1738), member of the Gaffron noble family
 Adam Abramowicz (1710–1766), Polish Jesuit
 Adam Abu, Ghanaian politician
 Adam Acres (1878–1955), Canadian politician and farmer
 Adam Adamczyk (born 1950), Polish judoka
 Adam Adami (born 1992), Brazilian footballer
 Adam Adami (1603 or 1610 – 1663), German diplomat and priest
 Adam Adamowicz (1968–2012), American video game concept artist
 Adam Adamson (1884–1984), New Zealand businessman, accountant, and politician
 Adam Adler, British television executive producer
 Adam Adli (born 1989), Malaysian student activist
 Adam Adrio (1901–1973), German musicologist and college professor
 Adam Afriyie (born 1965), British politician
 Adam Afzelius (1750–1837), Swedish botanist
 Adam Agius, lead vocalist of the Australian progressive metal band Alchemist
 Adam Christian Agricola (1593–1645), Cieszyn evangelical preacher
 Adam Aitken (born 1960), Australian poet
 Adam Emory Albright (1862–1957), American painter
 Adam Alexander (born 1973), American sportscaster
 Adam Alexander (born 1998), American singer-songwriter known professionally as Demo Taped
 Adam Rankin Alexander (1781–1848), American politician
 Adam Alexi-Malle (born 1964), Italian actor, singer, dancer, and musician
 Adam Alilet (born 1997), Algerian footballer
 Adam Abdullah Al-Ilory (1917–1992), Benin-Nigerian Islamic scholar
 Adam All, British drag king, performer, and host
 Adam Allan (1904 – after 1937), Scottish footballer
 Adam Allouche (born 1993), French-Lebanese competitive swimmer
 Adam Almiliby, Portuguese businessman and tax collector
 Adam Almqvist (born 1991), Swedish ice hockey player
 Adam Alsing (1968–2020), Swedish television and radio host
 Adam Alter, American author and businessman
 Adam Amandi (1926–2006), Ghanaian educationist, farmer, environmentalist, and politician
 Adam d'Ambergau (15th century), Bavarian compositor
 Adam Ambra (born 1993), Slovak footballer
 Adam Amin (born 1986), American television and radio sportscaster
 Adam Amirilayev (born 1963), Russian politician
 Adam Anders (born 1975), Swedish film, television, and music producer
 Adam Anderson (1692 or 1693 – 1765), Scottish economist, clerk in South Sea House
 Adam Anderson (1783–1846), Scottish physicist and encyclopedist
 Adam Anderson (born 1985), American monster truck driver
Adam Anderson (born 1984), British musician
Adam Anderson (born 1969), Australian tennis player
Adam Anderson (born 1999), American college football player
 Adam Anderson, Lord Anderson (c. 1797–1853), Scottish judge
 Adam Andersson (born 1996), Swedish footballer
 Adam Andretti (born 1979), American racing driver
 Adam Andruszkiewicz (born 1990), Polish politician
 Adam Anhang (1973–2005), Canadian online gambling executive and murder victim
 Adam Ant (born 1954), English singer and actor, lead singer of Adam and the Ants
 Adam Antes (1891–1984), German sculptor and graphic artist
 Adam Apple (1831–1905), German-American immigrant, farmer, carpenter, and politician
 Adam Applegarth (born 1962), English banker, CEO of Northern Rock
 Adam Archibald (1879–1957), Scottish soldier and recipient of the Victoria Cross
 Adam Archuleta (born 1977), American football player
 Adam Arcuragi, American death gospel songwriter and musician
 Adam Ariel (born 1994), Israeli basketball player
 Adam Arkapaw, Australian cinematographer
 Adam Arkin (born 1956), American television, film, and stage actor and director
 Adam Armour (born 2002), American soccer player
 Adam Armstong (1788–1853), European settler
 Adam Armstrong (born 1997), English footballer
 Adam Alexander Armstrong (1909–1982), Australian politician, known as Bill Armstrong
 Adam Loftus Armstrong (1878–1959), New Zealand rugby union player
 Adam Arndtsen (1829–1919), Norwegian physicist and professor
 Adam Arnold (born 1981), American comic book creator
 Adam Aron (born 1954), American businessman
 Adam Arthur (born 1985), English footballer
 Adam Asghar (born 1994), Scottish footballer and coach
 Adam Ashburnham, English politician
 Adam Ashe (born 1993), Scottish rugby union player
 Adam Ashley-Cooper (born 1984), Australian rugby union player
 Adam Asnyk (1838–1897), Polish poet, dramatist and freedom fighter
 Adam Assimi, Beninese middle-distance runner
 Adam Astill, English actor
 Adam Aston (1902–1993), Polish singer, actor and pianist
 Adam Atkinson (born 1967), English priest
 Adam Auckland (born 1993), English squash player
 Adam Austin (1911–1970), Scottish rugby union referee
 Adam Austin (1926–2011), pseudonym used by American comic book artist Gene Colan
 Adam Averell (1754–1847), Irish primitive Wesleyan clergy
 Adam Ayles (1850–1912), English Arctic explorer
 Adam Azimov, Canadian film director

B 
 Adam Babah-Alargi (1927–2019), Ghanaian engineer
 Adam Baboulas (born 1987), Canadian football player
 Adam Bacher (born 1973), South African cricketer
 Adam Bachmann (1890–1966), Estonian politician
 Adam Back (born 1970), British cryptographer, cypherpunk, and businessman
 Adam Badeau (1831–1895), American author, Union Army officer, and diplomat
 Adam Bagni (born 1984), American journalist and sportscaster
 Adam Bahdaj (1918–1985), Polish translator and writer
 Adam Bahdanovič (1862–1940), Belarusian ethnographer and folklore historian
 Adam Yuki Baig (born 1999), Japanese handball player
 Adam Bailey (born 1989), English footballer and coach
 Adam Leitman Bailey (born 1970), American lawyer
 Adam Bajalics von Bajahaza (1734–1800), Austrian soldier
 Adam Baker (born 1993), English footballer
 Adam Baker, lead vocalist and founder of the American indie band Annuals
 Adam Baker, English entrepreneur and founder of the website Blottr
 Adam J. Baker (1821–1912), Canadian politician
 Adam Bakri (born 1988), Palestinian actor
 Adam Balding (born 1979), English rugby union player
 Adam Baldridge (1690–1697), English pirate and settler
 Adam Baldwin (born 1962), American actor
 Adam Baldwin (born 1986), Canadian indie rock singer-songwriter
 Adam Bałdych (born 1986), Polish violinist, composer, and music producer
 Adam Ball (born 1993), English cricketer
 Adam Ballinger (born 1979), American-Australian basketball player
 Adam Ballou (born 1992), American soccer player
 Adam Bamme (died 1397), English goldsmith and politician
 Adam Banasiak (born 1989), Polish footballer
 Adam Banaś (born 1982), Polish footballer
 Adam Bandt (born 1972), Australian Green politician and industrial lawyer
 Adam Banton (born 1975), American freestyle BMX rider, musician, and businessman
 Adam Barclay (born 1970), Australian bobsledder 
 Adam Bareiro (born 1996), Paraguayan footballer
 Adam Bargielski (1903–1942), Polish Roman Catholic priest
 Adam Bark (born 2000), Swedish footballer
 Adam Barr, American television screenwriter and producer
 Adam Barrett (born 1979), English footballer
 Adam Barrett (born 1992), English swimmer
 Adam Barry (born 1981), English musician
 Adam Barta (born 1979), American actor, reality star, and musician
 Adam Bartlett (born 1986), English goalkeeper
 Adam Bartley (born 1979), American actor
 Adam Barton (born 1991), English footballer
 Adam Barton (born 1995), English cricketer
 Adam Bartoš (born 1992), Czech volleyball player
 Adam Bartsch (1757–1821), Austrian scholar and artist
 Adam Baruch (1945–2008), Israeli journalist, newspaper editor, writer, and art critic
 Adam Barwood (born 1992), New Zealand alpine skier
 Adam Basanta (born 1985), Canadian artist and experimental composer
 Adam Basil (born 1975), Australian track and field athlete
 Adam Bass (born 1981), American baseball player
 Adam J. Bass, American businessman, lawyer, and politician
 Adam Bassett, British lighting designer
 Adam Batirov (born 1985), Russian-Bahraini freestyle wrestler
 Adam II. Batthyány (1662–1703), Hungarian general and noble
 Adam Baumann (1948–2021), Polish actor
 Adam Baworowski (1913–1943), Austrian-Polish tennis player
 Adam Bayliss (born 1979), Australian film producer
 Adam Baynes (1622–1671), English Army officer
 Adam Beach (born 1972), Canadian Saulteaux actor
 Adam Beales (born 1999), Irish YouTuber, actor, and television host known professionally as Adam B.
 Adam Beard (born 1996), Welsh rugby union player
 Adam Beashel (fl. 1999–2009), Australian sailor
 Adam Beattie (1833–1893), American politician
 Adam Beaumont (born 1972), English businessman, angel investor, trustee, and digital entrepreneur
 Adam Beck (1857–1925), Canadian politician
 Adam Becker (born 1984), American astrophysicist, author, and scientific philosopher
 Adam Beckett (1950–1979), American animator, special effects artist, and teacher
 Adam Beckman (born 2001), Canadian ice hockey player
 Adam Bedell (born 1991), American soccer player
 Adam Beechen (born 1954), American comic book writer
 Adam Beechey (born 1981), Australian racing driver
 Adam Beeler (1879–1947), American politician
 Adam Begley (born 1959), American freelance writer and editor
 Adam Bełcikowski (1839–1909), Polish philosopher, historian, poet, and dramaturg
 Adam Bell, English outlaw
 Adam Carr Bell (1847–1912), Canadian politician
 Adam Bellenden (1569–1647), Scottish Bishop
 Adam Bellow, American executive editor
 Adam Ingi Benediktsson (born 2002), Icelandic footballer
 Adam Benisz (1888–1991), Polish Army officer
 Adam Benjamin, American jazz keyboardist and composer
 Adam Benjamin Jr. (1935–1982), American politician
 Adam Bennett (born 1971), Canadian ice hockey player
 Adam S. Bennion (1886–1958), American politician and businessman
 Adam Bentick (born 1985), Australian rules footballer
 Adam Benzine, British filmmaker and journalist
 Adam Berg (1540–1610), German printer and publisher
 Adam Berg (born 1972), Swedish director and writer
Adam Bergen (born 1983), American football player
Adam Bergendahl (born 1994), Swedish ice hockey player
Adam Berger (born 1990), Canadian football player
Adam Bergman (born 1980), American cyclist
Adam Bergqvist (born 1993), Swedish ice hockey player
Adam Berinsky (born 1970), American political science professor
Adam Berkhoel (born 1981), American ice hockey goaltender
Adam J. Bernard (born 1988), British actor and singer
Adam Berner (born 1987), Swedish footballer
Adam Bernero (born 1976), American baseball pitcher
 Adam Bernstein (born 1960), American director
 Adam Berry (born 1966), American television and film composer
 Adam Berry (born 1992), Irish cricketer
 Adam Berry (born 1997), Australian footballer
 Adam K. Bert (1905–2007), American philatelist
 Adam Berti (born 1986), Canadian ice hockey player
 Adam Bertocci (born 1982), American filmmaker
 Adam Bessa (born 1992), French-Tunisian actor
 Adam Best (born 1982), Irish actor
 Adam Beveridge (1826–1907), Scottish-Canadian merchant and political figure
 Adam Beyer (born 1976), Swedish techno producer and DJ
 Adam Bice (born 1989), American football player
 Adam Biddle (born 1988), Australian footballer
 Adam Biddle, English cinematographer
 Adam Bielan (born 1974), Polish politician
 Adam Bielański (1912–2016), Polish chemist and professor
 Adam Bielecki (born 1983), Polish alpine and high-altitude climber
Adam Bighill (born 1988), American gridiron football player
Adam Billaut (1602–1662), French carpenter, poet, and singer
Adam Bilzerian (born 1983), American-Nevisian poker player and writer
Adam Lewis Bingaman (1793–1869), American politician
 Adam Birch (born 1979), American professional wrestler, known as Joey Mercury or Joey Matthews
 Adam Birchall (born 1984), English footballer and coach
 Adam Bird, American politician
 Adam Birnbaum (born 1979), American jazz pianist, composer, and arranger
 Adam Biro, Hungarian publisher and author
 Adam Birtwistle (born 1959), British artist
 Adam Bischof (born 1915), Austrian field hockey player
 Adam Bishop (born 1989), English strongman
 Adam Bisnowaty (born 1993), American football player
 Adam Bittleston (1817–1892), British-Indian judge
 Adam Bizanski (born 1983), Israeli writer, director, and animator
 Adam Black (1784–1874), Scottish publisher and politician
 Adam Black (1839–1902), Australian politician
 Adam Black (1898–1981), Scottish-born footballer
 Adam Black (born 1975), English rugby union player
 Adam Black (born 1992), English footballer
 Adam Blacklaw (1937–2010), Scottish goalkeeper
 Adam Blackley (born 1985), Australian baseball player
 Adam Blackstone (born 1982), American multi-instrumentalist, songwriter, producer, and bassist
 Adam Blackwell, Canadian diplomat
 Adam Blackwood (1539–1613), Scottish author and apologist
 Adam Blackwood (born 1959), English actor
 Adam Blair (born 1986), New Zealand rugby league footballer
 Adam Johnston Fergusson Blair (1815–1867), Scottish-Canadian lawyer, judge, and politician
 Adam Blake (born 1976), English producer, musician, and songwriter
 Adam Blakeman (1596–1665), English clergyman and migrant
 Adam Blakeman (born 1991), English footballer
 Adam Bland (born 1982), Australian golfer
 Adam Blatner (born 1937), American psychologist, psychology theorist, and author
 Adam Bleakney, American Paralympic track and field athlete
 Adam Block (1951–2008), American writer and music critic
 Adam Block (born 1973), American astrophotographer, astronomy researcher, writer and instructor
 Adam Bloom (born 1970), British comedian and writer
 Adam Blumenthal, American businessman and private equity firm executive
 Adam Bly (born 1981), Canadian scientist and entrepreneur
 Adam Blyth (born 1981), Australian golfer
 Adam Blythe (born 1989), English racing cyclist
Adam Bob (1967–2019), American football player
 Adam Bock, Canadian playwright
 Adam Bodnar (born 1977), Polish lawyer, educator, and human rights activist
 Adam Bodzek (born 1985), German-Polish footballer
 Adam S. Boehler (born 1979), American businessman and politician
 Adam Bogardus (1834–1913), American trap shooter
 Ádám Bogdán (born 1987), Hungarian footballer
 Adam Bogdanove (born 1964), American scientist and professor 
 Adam Bogle (1848–1915), British soldier and footballer
 Adam Bogosavljević (1843–1880), Serbian politician and farmer
 Adam Bohling, British film producer
 Adam Bohorič (1520–1598), Slovene preacher, teacher, and author
 Adam Boland (born 1977), Australian television producer and director
 Adam Bolder (born 1980), English footballer
 Adam Bomb (born 1963), American guitarist and singer
 Adam Bomb (born 1964), American wrestler whose real name is Bryan Clark
 Adam Bombolé (born 1957), Congo politician
 Adam Bond, British-American actor and stage director
 Adam Booth (born 1994), British boxing trainer
 Adam Boqvist (born 2000), Swedish ice hockey player
 Adam Boreel (1602–1665), Dutch theologian and scholar
 Adam Boryczka (1913–1988), Polish Army Captain
 Adam Borzecki (born 1978), Polish-German ice hockey player
 Adam Bosworth, American businessman and software engineer
 Adam Botana (born 1984), American politician
 Adam Botbyl, American computer hacker
 Adam Botek (born 1997), Slovak sprint canoeist
 Adam Bothwell (1527–1593), Scottish clergyman, judge, and politician
 Adam Bouchard (born 1996), Canadian soccer player
 Adam Boujamaa (born 1998), French footballer
 Adam Boulton (born 1959), British journalist and broadcaster
 Adam Bousdoukos (born 1974), German actor 
 Adam Bouska (born 1983), American fashion photographer 
 Adam Bouzid (born 1987), French-Algerian footballer 
 Adam Giede Böving (1869–1957), Danish-American entomologist and zoologist 
 Adam Bowden (born 1982), British triathlete and runner 
 Adam Bowen (born 1974/1975), American businessman
 Adam Bowman (1880–1937), Scottish footballer 
 Adam Box, American drummer for the country duo Brothers Osborne 
 Adam Boyd (1746–1835), American politician and enslaver 
 Adam Boyd (born 1982), English footballer 
 Adam Boyes (born 1976), Canadian video game developer, executive, and businessman 
 Adam Boyes (footballer) (born 1990), English footballer 
 Adam Brace (born 1980), British playwright 
 Adam Bradbury (born 1991), English volleyball player 
 Adam Bradley (born 1961), American politician 
 Adam Bradley (born 1974), American literary critic, professor, and writer 
 Adam Braidwood (born 1984), Canadian professional boxer, actor, martial artist, and football player 
 Adam Brand (1692–1746), German merchant and explorer 
 Adam Brand (born 1970), Australian country singer
 Adam Braver (born 1963), American author
 Adam L. Braverman (born 1975), American politician
 Adam Bravin, American musician and producer known professionally as DJ Adam 12
 Adam Braz (born 1981), Canadian soccer player
 Adam Breneman (born 1995), American football player and political operative
 Adam Brenkus (born 1999), Slovak footballer
 Adam Brideson (born 1981), Australian rugby league footballer
 Adam Bridle (born 1987), professional wrestler, known as Angélico
 Adam Bright (born 1984), Australian baseball pitcher
 Adam Briscomb, Australian actor
 Adam Bristow (born 1973), Australian rugby league footballer
 Adam Brocklebank (born 1995), English rugby union player
 Adam Brodecki (1949–2010), Polish pediatrician, politician, and competitive pair skater
 Adam Brodecki (born 1995), Swedish ice hockey player
 Adam Brodsky, American anti-folk singer
 Adam Brody (born 1979), American actor, writer, and musician
 Adam Brodzisz (1906–1986), Polish actor
 Adam Bromberg (1912–1993), Polish publisher and politician
 Adam Bromley, British television and radio producer and director
 Adam Bronikowski (born 1978), Polish rower
 Adam Brook, American thoracic surgeon
 Adam Brookes (born 1963), Canadian-British-American novelist and journalist
 Adam Brooks (born 1956), Canadian film director, screenwriter, and actor
 Adam Brooks (born 1975), Australian politician
 Adam Brooks (born 1991), Australian wrestler
 Adam Brooks (born 1996), Canadian ice hockey player
 Adam Broomberg (born 1970), English artist
 Adam Brown (1826–1926), Canadian politician and merchant
 Adam Brown (1920–1960), Scottish-Canadian hockey player
 Adam Brown (born 1980), English actor, comedian, and pantomime performer
 Adam Brown (born 1981), American music educator
 Adam Brown (born 1986), American politician
 Adam Brown (born 1987), Welsh rugby union player
 Adam Brown (born 1989), British freestyle swimmer
 Adam Brown (born 1995), Scottish footballer
 Adam Brown of Blackford (1660–1711), Scottish merchant and Lord Provost of Edinburgh
 Adam M. Brown (1826–1901), American politician
 Adam Browne (born 1963), Australian science fiction writer and illustrator
 Sir Adam Browne, 2nd Baronet (c. 1626–1690), royalist commander in the English Civil War
 Adam Broż (born 1935), Polish art historian and journalist
 Adam Bruce (born 1968), Scottish solicitor, businessman, and aristocrat
 Adam Buck (1759–1833), Irish neo-classical portraitist and miniature painter and engraver
 Adam Buckingham (born 1988), British acrobatic gymnast
 Adam Buckley (born 1979), English footballer
 Adam Buddle (1662–1715), English cleric and botanist
 Adam Budnikowski (born 1948), Polish economist
 Adam Bugajski (born 1974), Polish civil servant and politician
 Adam Buick (born 1944), English socialist and politician
 Adam Buksa (born 1996), Polish footballer
 Adam Burakowski (born 1977), Polish diplomat, politician, political scientist, and historian
 Adam Burdett (1882–1918), South African rugby union player
 Adam Burgess (born 1992), British slalom canoeist
 Adam Burish (born 1983) American ice hockey player
 Adam Burke (1971–2018), Irish ocean rower
 Adam Burke (born 1976), American stand-up comedian, writer, and comic artist
 Adam Burkhammer, American politician and pastor
 Adam Burley (died 1327/1328), English philosopher
 Adam Burrows, American astrophysical scientist and professor
 Adam Burski (ca. 1560–1611), Polish philosopher
 Adam Burt (born 1969), American ice hockey player
 Adam Burton (born 1972), Australian baseball player
 Adam Prosper Burzyński (1755–1830), Roman Catholic bishop and missionary
 Adam Busby (born 1948), Scottish convicted terrorist, malicious hoaxer, and politician
 Adam Busch (born 1978), American actor, film director, and singer
 Adam Buszko (born 1975), Polish musician, vocalist, composer, and multi-instrumentalist known professionally as ATF Sinner
 Adam Butcher (born 1988), Canadian actor
 Adam Butler (1931–2008), British politician
 Adam Butler (born 1972), English electronic music record producer known professionally as Vert
 Adam Butler (born 1973), American baseball pitcher
 Adam Butler (born 1994), American football player
 Adam Buxton (born 1969), British actor, comedian, podcaster, and writer
 Adam Buxton (born 1992), English footballer
 Adam Bygrave (born 1989), English footballer
 Adam Byram (born 1971), English cricketer
 Adam M. Byrd (1859–1912), American politician
 Adam Byrne (born 1994), Irish rugby union player
 Adam Byrnes (born 1981), Australian immigration lawyer
 Adam Bysouth (born 1979), Canadian lacrosse player and coach

C 
 Adam Cadre (born 1974), American writer
 Adam Cahan (born 1971), American consumer technology executive and businessman
 Adam Calhoun (born 1980), American rapper, singer, songwriter, and comedian
 Adam Campbell (born 1980), English actor
 Adam Campbell (born 1985), New Zealand Australian rules footballer
 Adam Campbell (born 1995), English footballer
 Adam Capay (born 1993), Canadian murderer
 Adam Caporn (born 1982), Australian basketball player and coach
 Adam Cappa (born 1985), American contemporary Christian and rock singer-songwriter
 Adam Carlén (born 2000), Swedish footballer
 Adam Carmer (born 1966), American entrepreneur, professor, and author
 Adam Carolla (born 1964), American comedian
 Adam Carriker (born 1984), American football player
Adam Carroll (born 1975), American musician
 Adam Carroll (born 1982), Northern Irish racing driver
 Adam Carse (1878–1958), English composer, academic, songwriter, and editor
 Adam Carson (died 1935), Scottish footballer
 Adam Carson (born 1975), drummer of the American alternative rock band AFI
 Adam Carter (born 1994), Australian rules footballer
 Adam Casad (1879–1927), American football player and U.S. Army Officer
Adam Casey (born 1986), Australian footballer
Adam Casey (born 1989), Canadian curler
Adam M. Casey, American football player, U.S. Marine Infantry Officer, and businessman
 Adam Castillejo, Second person to be cured of HIV infection, nicknamed "The London Patient".
 Adam Cayton-Holland (born 1980), American stand-up comedian, writer, and podcaster
 Adam Cerra (born 1999), Australian rules footballer
 Adam Cesare (born 1988), American author
 Adam Chadaj (born 1984), Polish tennis player
 Adam Chamberlain (born 1972), English author
 Adam Chambers (born 1980), English footballer
 Adam Chambers, Canadian politician
 Adam Chanler-Berat (born 1986), American stage and film director and singer
 Adam Chapman (born 1989), Northern Irish footballer
 Adam Chartoi (born 1997), Swedish boxer
 Adam Chase (1928–2008), pseudonym used by American author, Stephen Marlowe
 Adam Chase, writer and television producer
 Adam Chatfield (born 1979), Australian rules footballer
 Adam Chazen (born 1986), American special effects producer
 Adam Chen (born 1976), Singaporean television and film actor, born Zhān Jīnquán
 Adam Cheng (born 1947), Hong Kong actor and singer
 Adam Chennoufi (born 1988), Swedish footballer
 Adam Chętnik (1885–1967), Polish ethnographer
 Adam Cheyer (born c. 1966), American businessman
 Adam Chicksen (born 1991), English footballer
 Adam Chlapík (born 1994), Czech ice hockey player
 Adam Chodzko (born 1965), British contemporary artist
 Adam Choice (born 1995), American football player
 Adam Chorneyko (born 1988), Canadian ice hockey player
 Adam Chowaniec (1950–2015), Canadian engineer, entrepreneur, and educator
 Adam Christie, Canadian stand-up comedian
 Adam Christing, American comedian, author, and motivational speaker
 Adam Christodoulou (born 1989), British racing driver
 Adam Christopher (born 1978), New Zealand novelist
 Adam Chromý (born 1988), Czech orienteering competitor
 Adam Chrzanowski (born 1999), Polish footballer
 Adam Chubb (born 1981), American basketball player
 Adam Cianciarulo (born 1996), American motocross and supercross racer
 Adam Cichon (born 1975), German footballer
 Adam Cieślar (born 1992), Polish Nordic combined skier
 Adam Cieśliński (born 1982), Polish footballer
 Adam Cifu, American physician, academic, author, and researcher
 Adam Cimber (born 1990), American baseball pitcher
 Adam Ciołkosz (1901–1978), Polish scout, soldier, publicist, and politician
 Adam G. Ciongoli (born 1968), American lawyer
 Adam Ciralsky (born 1971), American journalist, television and film producer, and attorney
 Adam Clapham, author, former BBC executive
 Adam Clark (1811–1866), Scottish civil engineer
 Adam Clark, American meteorologist
Adam Christian Clark (born 1980), American film director
 Adam Clarke (1762–1832), British Methodist theologian and biblical scholar
 Adam Clarke (born 1981), English cricketer
 Adam Clarke (born 1984), English cricketer
 Adam Clawson (1972–2017), American slalom canoeist
 Adam Clay (born 1982), American soccer player
 Adam Clay (born 1990), English rugby league footballer
 Adam Clayton (born 1960), bass player in U2
 Adam Clayton (born 1989), English professional footballer
 Adam Clendening (born 1992), American ice hockey player
 Adam C. Cliffe (1869–1928), American politician
 Adam Clift (born 1962), British rower
 Adam Clune (born 1995), Australian rugby league footballer
 Adam Clydsdale (born 1993), Australian rugby league footballer
 Adam Clymer (1937–2018), American journalist
 Adam Coakley (born 1987), Scottish footballer
 Adam Cockburn, Australian actor
 Adam Cockburn, Lord Ormiston (1656–1735), Scottish administrator, politician, and judge
 Adam Cockie (born 1989), Australian rules footballer
 Adam Cockshell (born 1986), Australian rules footballer
 Adam Cohen (born c. 1962), American journalist, author, lawyer, and editor
 Adam Cohen (born 1972), Canadian musician, frontman of the band Low Millions
 Adam Cohen (born 1979), American chemist and professor
 Adam Cole (born 1974), English cricketer
 Adam Cole (Austin Jenkins) (born 1989), American professional wrestler
 Adam Coleman (born 1991), Australian rugby union player
 Adam Collin (born 1984), English goalkeeper
 Adam Collins (born 1984), Australian journalist and sports broadcaster
 Adam Collis, American filmmaker and actor
 Adam Colonia (1634–1685), Dutch painter
 Adam Commens (born 1976), Australian field hockey player and coach
 Adam Comorosky (1905–1951), American baseball player
 Adam Comrie (1990–2020), Canadian-American ice hockey player
 Adam Comstock (1740–1819), American soldier and politician
 Adam Conley (born 1990), American baseball pitcher
 Adam Connelly (born 1979), Australian rugby league footballer
 Adam Connolly (born 1986), English footballer
 Adam Conover (born 1983), American comedian, writer, voice actor, and television host
 Adam Contessa (born 1976), Australian rules footballer
 Adam Contzen (1571–1635), German Jesuit economist and exegete
 Adam Cook (1977–2008), New Zealand rugby league player 
 Adam Cook (born 1979), former English cricketer
 Adam Cook (born 2000), Australian rugby league player
 Adam Cooley, American artist
 Adam Coombes (born 1991), English footballer
 Adam Coon (born 1994), American wrestler and football player
 Adam Cooney (born 1985), Australian rules footballer
 Adam Cooper (born 1971), English actor, choreographer, dancer, and theater director
 Adam Cooper (born 1977), American soccer player and coach
 Adam Coote, Australian rules football umpire and sprinter
 Adam Copeland (born 1973), Canadian pro wrestler best known as Edge
 Adam E. Cornelius (1882–1953), American businessman
 Adam Cornford (born 1950), British poet, journalist, and essayist
 Adam Cost, American graffiti artist known professionally as Cost
 Adam Courchaine (born 1984), Canadian ice hockey player
 Adam Cox (born 1986), British artistic gymnast
 Adam Cozad, American screenwriter
 Adam Crabb (born 1984), Australian baseball pitcher
 Adam Cracknell (born 1985), Canadian ice hockey player
 Adam Craig (born 1981), American mountain biker
 Adam Craig (born 1995), British long-distance runner
 Adam Craig, American country music singer-songwriter
 Adam Jamal Craig (born 1978), American actor
 Adam Creedy, English politician
 Adam Creighton (ice hockey) (born 1965), Canadian ice hockey player
 Adam Creighton, Australian journalist
 Adam Cristman (born 1985), American soccer player
 Adam Croasdell (born 1976), Zimbabwean-British actor
 Adam Croft, English writer
 Adam Crookes (born 1997), English footballer
 Adam Crooks (1824–1874), Wesleyan Methodist minister
 Adam Crooks (1827–1885), Canadian politician
 Adam Brown Crosby (1856–1921), Canadian politician
 Adam Crosswhite (1799–1878), American escaped slave
 Adam Crosthwaite (born 1984), Australian cricketer
 Adam Crouch (born 1972), Australian politician
 Adam Crozier (born 1964), Scottish businessman
 Adam Crusius (died 1608), German diplomat
 Adam Cruz, American jazz drummer
 Adam Crystal, American composer, violinist, and keyboardist
 Adam Cullen (1965–2012), Australian artist
 Adam Cummins (born 1993), English footballer
 Adam Cunnington (born 1987), English footballer
 Adam Curle (1916–2006), British academic
 Adam Curry (born 1964), original MTV VJ
 Adam Curry (born 1997), English footballer
 Adam Curtis (born 1955), English filmmaker
 Adam S. G. Curtis (1934–2017), British cell biologist
 Adam Cusack (c. 1630–1681), Irish landowner, barrister, and judge
 Adam Cushing (born 1980), American football coach
 Adam Cushman (born 1974), American film director, producer, screenwriter, and author
 Adam Cuthbertson (born 1985), Australian rugby league player
 Adam Cvijanovic (born 1960), American painter
 Adam Cwalina (born 1985), Polish badminton player
 Adam Cwejman (born 1985), Swedish politician
 Adam Cyra (born 1949), Polish historian
 Adam Sędziwój Czarnkowski (1555–1628), Polish nobleman
 Adam Jerzy Czartoryski (1770–1861), Polish-Lithuanian prince
 Adam Karol Czartoryski (born 1940), Polish-Spanish aristocrat
 Adam Kazimierz Czartoryski (1734–1823), Polish writer and statesman
 Adam Ludwik Czartoryski (1872–1937), Polish nobleman, landowner, and patron of the arts
 Adam Czerkas (born 1984), Polish footballer
 Adam Czerniaków (1880–1942), Polish-Jewish engineer and senator

D 
 Adam D'Angelo (born 1984), American internet entrepreneur
 Adam D'Apuzzo (born 1986), Australian footballer
 Adam D'Arcy, Irish rugby union player
 Adam Dale (born 1968), Australian cricketer
 Adam Dalgleish (1868–1938), Scottish rugby union player
 Adam Damlip (died 1540s), English martyr
 Adam Danch (born 1987), Polish footballer
 Adam Danielewicz (1846–1935), Polish statistician
 Adam Dant (born 1967), British artist
 Adam Darius (born 1930), American dancer, mime artist, writer, and choreographer
 Adam Darr (1811–1866), German classical guitarist, singer, zither player, and composer
 Adam Darragh (born 1979), Australian basketball player
 Adam Darski (born 1977), Polish musician and television personality, known by the stage name Nergal
 Adam Davenport (born 1984), American actor, DJ, record producer, singer, songwriter, and filmmaker
 Adam Davidson (1929–2007), Scottish footballer
 Adam Davidson (born 1964), American actor and television director
 Adam Davidson (born 1970), American journalist
 Adam Davidson (born 1983), American tennis player
 Adam Davies (born 1971), American author
 Adam Davies (born 1980), Welsh cricketer
 Adam Davies (born 1987), English-Welsh footballer
 Adam Davies (born 1992), German football goalkeeper
 Adam Davies, English snooker player
 Adam Davis, Australian rules football umpire
 Adam Davis, English pool player
 Adam 'Tex' Davis (fl. 1997–2005), American screenwriter and director
 Adam Dawson (1793–1873), Scottish distiller
 Adam Dawson (born 1992), English footballer
 Adam Dawson, English colonial administrator
 Adam Alexander Dawson (1913–2010), British film and television editor
 Adam Day, American poet and critic
 Adam Deacon (born 1983), English actor, rapper, and writer
 Adam Deadmarsh (born 1975), former Canadian-American professional ice hockey player
 Adam Dean, Australian sprint canoer
 Adam Deans (born 1988), Australian wheelchair basketball player
 Adam Jacot de Boinod (born 1960), British author
 Adam DeBus (1892–1977), German-American baseball player
 Adam Dechanel (born 1978), British author, illustrator, graphic designer, and producer
 Adam Dedio (1918–1947), Polish Army and Navy officer
 Adam DeGraide (born 1971), American businessman
 Adam Deibert (born 1976), American musician and voice actor
 Adam Deitch (born 1976), American record producer and drummer
 Adam Deja (born 1993), Polish footballer
 Adam Delimkhanov (born 1969), Russian politician
 Adam Dell (born 1970), American businessman
 Adam Demos (born 1985), Australian actor
 Adam Dennis (born 1985), Canadian-Italian ice hockey goaltender
 Adam Dennison (born 1997), Irish cricketer
 Adam Charles Gustave Desmazures (1818–1891), Canadian author and Catholic priest
 Adam Deutsch (born 1995), Swedish ice hockey player
 Adam DeVine, American comedian, writer, producer, actor, and voice actor
 Adam Devlin (born 1969), English musician, guitarist, and songwriter
 Adam Dewes (born 1996), English cricketer
 Adam De La Cour (born 1979), British composer
 Adam Perez Diaz (1909–2010), American politician
 Adam Dibble (born 1991), English cricketer
 Adam Dickinson, Canadian poet
 Adam H. Dicky (1864–1925), Canadian author, scientist, and secretary
 Adam Diment (born 1943), English novelist
 Adam DiMichele (born 1985), American football player and coach
 Adam Dircksz (1500–1530), Dutch sculptor, real name unknown
 Adam DiVello, American television producer
 Adam Dixon (born 1986), English field hockey player
 Adam Dixon (born 1989), Canadian ice sledge player
 Adam Dlouhý (born 1994), Czech ice hockey player
 Adam Doboszyński (1904–1951), Polish Army soldier, writer, engineer, and social activist
 Adam Docker (born 1985), English footballer
 Adam Docker (born 1991), Australian rugby league player
 Adam Dodd (born 1993), English footballer
 Adam Dodek, Canadian professor and dean
 Adam Dolatowski (born 1957), Polish field hockey player
 Adam Doleac (born 1988), American country music singer-songwriter
 Adam Dollard des Ormeaux (1635–1660), French colonial soldier
 Adam Doneger (born 1980), American lacrosse player
 Adam Donovan, Australian musician
 Adam Dorrel (born 1974), American football player and coach
 Adam Doueihi (born 1998), Lebanese rugby league player
 Adam Doughty (born 1958), English kora player, teacher, and maker
 Adam Doukas (1790–1860), Greek revolutionary and politician
 Adam Dowdy (born 1975), American baseball umpire
 Adam Dread (born 1963), American politician, attorney, and businessman
 Adam Drese (1620–1701), German composer, kapellmeister, and bass viol player
 Adam Drewnowski (born 1948), Polish professor and epidemiologist
 Adam Drgoň (born 1985), Slovak ice hockey player
 Adam Driggs (born 1965), American attorney, politician, and jurist
 Adam Driver (born 1983), American actor
 Adam Drucker (born 1977), American rapper, known by the stage name Doseone
 Adam Drummond (1679–1758), Scottish surgeon
 Adam Drummond (politician) (1713–1786), Scottish merchant, banker, and politician
 Adam Drummond, 17th Baron Strange (born 1953), English peer
 Adam Drury (born 1978), English footballer
 Adam Drury (born 1993), English footballer
 Adam Dubin (born 1964), American filmmaker
 Adam Duce (born 1972), American musician
 Adam Duda (born 1991), Polish footballer
 Adam Duffin (1841–1924), Irish unionist politician
 Adam Duffy (born 1989), English snooker player
Adam Dugdale (born 1987), English footballer
Adam Duggleby (born 1984), British cyclist
Adam Duhe Jr. (born 1955), American football player, known as A.J. Duhe
Adam Dulęba (1895–1944), Polish photographer and soldier, known under the pseudonym Góral
Adam Duncan (born 1833, death date unknown), American Union Navy sailor
Adam Duncan (1852–1940), Indian-English lawyer and cricketer
 Adam Duncan, 1st Viscount Duncan of Camperdown (1731–1804), British admiral
 Adam M. Duncan (1927–2000), American missionary and lawyer
 Adam Dunkels (born 1978), Swedish computer scientist, computer programmer, entrepreneur, and businessman
 Adam Dunn (born 1979), first baseman for the Chicago White Sox
 Adam Duritz (born 1964), American singer, musician, and film and record producer, frontman for rock band Counting Crows
 Adam Dutkiewicz (born 1977), lead guitarist for American metalcore band Killswitch Engage
 Adam Duvall (born 1988), American baseball player
 Adam Duvendeck (born 1981), American track cyclist
 Adam Dyczkowski (1932–2021), Polish Catholic bishop
 Adam Dykes (1976–2009), New Zealand-Canadian wrestler known professionally as Adam Firestorm
 Adam Dykes (born 1977), Australian rugby league footballer
 Adam Dziewonski (1936–2016), Polish-American geophysicist
 Adam Dźwigała (born 1995), Polish footballer

E 
 Adam Fortunate Eagle (born 1929), Member of the Red Lake Band of Chippewa Indians
 Adam Earnheardt (born 1970), American academic, author, sports and communication researcher, and social media critic
 Adam Easton (1328/1338–1397), English Cardinal
 Adam Eaton (born 1977), American baseball pitcher
 Adam Eaton (born 1980), English footballer
 Adam Eaton (born 1988), American baseball player
 Adam Ebbin (born 1963), American politician
 Adam Eberle (1804–1832), German painter
 Adam Eckersley (born 1982), Australian singer, guitarist, and songwriter for the blues band Bluezone
 Adam Eckersley (born 1985), English footballer
 Adam Eckfeldt (1769–1852), American politician
 Adam Edelen (born 1974), American businessman, solar energy entrepreneur, and politician
 Adam Edelman (born 1991), American-Israeli Olympian athlete
 Adam Edström (born 2000), Swedish ice hockey player
Adam Edwards (born 1980), American racing driver
Adam Egede-Nissen (1868–1953), Norwegian postmaster and politician
Adam Eggich, Slovenian politician
Adam Eidinger (born 1973), American businessman and cannabis rights activist
Adam El-Abd (born 1984), English footballer
Adam Eli (born 1990), American activist and writer
Adam Elias von Siebold (1775–1828), German gynecologist
Adam B. Ellick, American journalist
Adam Elliot (died 1700), English clergyman and traveler
Adam Elliot (1802–1878), British missionary
 Adam Elliot (born 1972), Australian stop-motion animation writer, director, and producer
 Adam Elliott (born 1994), Australian rugby union league player
 Adam Ellis (born 1996), British grasstrack and speedway rider
 Adam Gibb Ellis, Chief Justice of Jamaica from 1884 to 1894
 Adam Elsheimer (1578–1610), German painter
 Adam Emery (born 1962, declared dead 2004), American fugitive
 Adam Emmenecker (born 1985), American basketball player
 Adam Empie (1785–1860), American priest
 Adam Engel (born 1991), American baseball player
 Adam English (born 2003), Irish hurler
 Adam C. Engst (born 1967), American technology writer and publisher
 Adam Ennafati (born 1994), Moroccan footballer
 Adam Enright (born 1983), Canadian curler
 Adam Epler (1891–1965), Polish Army soldier
 Adam Erdmann Trčka von Lípa (1599–1634), Bohemian nobleman and soldier
 Adam Eriksson (born 1988), Swedish footballer
 Adam Eriksson (born 1990), Swedish footballer
 Adam Erne (born 1995), American ice hockey player
 Adam Erskine (died >1608), Scottish landowner and courtier
 Adam Etches (born 1991), British boxer
 Adam Eustace (born 1979), English rugby union footballer
 Adam Evans (born 1994), Irish footballer
 Adam Everett (born 1977), former American professional baseball shortstop and third baseman
 Adam Exner (born 1928), Canadian Archbishop
 Adam Eyre (born 1978), American soccer player
 Adam Ben Ezra (born 1982), Israeli multi-instrumentalist, composer, and educator

F 
 Adam Fairclough (born 1952), English historian
 Adam Faith (1940–2003), British teen idol and financial journalist
 Adam Falckenhagen (1697–1754), German lutenist and composer
 Adam Falk (born 1965), American businessman and physicist
 Adam Falkenstein (1906–1966), German Assyriologist
 Adam Falkner, American author, poet, artist, and educator
 Adam Farley (born 1980), English footballer
 Adam Farouk (born 1985), French footballer
 Adam Storey Farrar (1826–1905), English churchman and academic
 Adam Fastnacht (1913–1987), Polish historian and editor
 Adam Fathi (born 1957), Tunisian poet, translator, and lyric poet
 Adam Faucett, American singer-songwriter
 Adam Faul (1929–2016), Canadian boxer
 Adam Faulkner (born 1981), English swimmer
 Adam Fawer (born 1970), American novelist
 Adam Federici (born 1985), Australian goalkeeper
 Adam Fedoruk (born 1966), Polish footballer
Adam Feeley (born 1977), American football player, known as A.J. Feeley
 Adam Feeney (born 1985), Australian tennis player
 Adam Felber, American political satirist, author, radio personality, actor, humorist, novelist, television writer, and comic book writer
 Adam Fellner (born 1993), Czech cross-country skier
 Adam Fenton (born 1972), English DJ and producer known professionally as Adam F.
 Adam Ferency (born 1951), Polish actor
 Adam Fergus, Irish film, television, and stage actor
 Adam Ferguson (1723–1816), Scottish philosopher and historian
 Adam Ferguson (1770–1854), British Army Officer
 Adam Ferguson (born 1978), Australian photographer
 Adam Fergusson (1706–1785), Scottish minister
 Adam Fergusson (1783–1862), Canadian politician and farmer
 Adam Fergusson (born 1932), British journalist, author, and politician
 Sir Adam Fergusson, 3rd Baronet (1733–1813), Scottish advocate and politician
 Adam Johnston Fergusson Blair (1815–1867), Scottish-Canadian lawyer, judge, and politician
 Adam Ferrara (born 1966), American actor and comedian
 Adam Ferrie (1777–1863), Canadian businessman and politician
 Adam Ferziger (born 1964), American Jewish historian
 Adam Fetterman (born 1970), American attorney and politician
Adam Feuerstein, American columnist and journalist in the biotechnology sector
Adam Fforde (born 1953), English economist
Adam Ficek (born 1974), English musician and psychotherapist
Adam Fidusiewicz (born 1985), Polish actor
Adam Fielding (born 1993), English actor
Adam Fielding, British electronic music producer and composer
Adam Fields, American executive, entrepreneur, and film and television producer
Adam Fierro, American television writer and producer
Adam Files (born 1993), English rugby league footballer
Adam Filipczak (1915–1992), American basketball player
Adam Finch (born 2000), English cricketer
Adam Finch, British film editor
Adam Finn, English pediatrician and professor
Adam Fischer (1888–1968), Danish sculptor
 Ádám Fischer (born 1949), Hungarian conductor
 Adam Fisher, American baseball executive
 Adam FitzRoy (1307–1322), illegitimate son of King Edward II of England
 Adam Fitzgerald (born 1983), American poet
 Adam Fiut (1933–1966), Polish film and theater actor
 Adam Flagler (born 1999), American basketball player
 Adam Flash (born 1971), American professional wrestler whose real name is Douglas Adam Becker
 Adam Fleetwood, British racing driver
 Adam Fleischman (born 1969/1970), American restaurateur and businessman
 Adam Fleming (born 1948), British businessman
 Adam Fleming (born 1980), Scottish journalist and newscaster
 Adam Fleming, Scottish footballer
 Adam Fletcher (born 1983), Australian rugby league footballer
 Adam Fletcher, Canadian writer, speaker, and consultant
 Adam Flores (born 1970), Mexican-American boxer
 Adam Flowers, American opera singer
 Adam Fogerty (born 1969), English actor, boxer, and rugby league footballer
 Adam Fogt (born 1993), Danish futsal player and footballer
 Adam Fong (born 1980), American composer, performer, and producer
 Adam Font, Irish politician
 Adam Foote (born 1971), Canadian ice hockey player
 Adam Ford, British archaeologist
 Adam Forde (born 1982), Australian basketball coach
 Adam Forepaugh (1831–1890), American entrepreneur, businessman and circus owner
 Adam Forkner (born 1976), American musician and producer, known as White Rainbow
 Adam Foroughi, American businessman
 Adam Forshaw (born 1991), English footballer
 Adam Forster (1848–1928), German botanical illustrator and naturalist
 Adam Forsyth (born 1981), Australian boxer
 Adam Foti (born 1984), Australian footballer
 Adam Foulds (born 1974), British novelist and poet
 Adam Fousek (born 1994), Czech footballer
 Adam Fox (1883–1977), British poet
 Adam Fox (born 1998), American ice hockey player
 Adam Fox, British allergist
 Adam Frączczak (born 1987), Polish footballer
 Adam Frampton (born 1980), American architect and educator
 Adam Frank (born 1962), American physicist, astronomer, and writer
 Adam Franklin, guitarist, singer, and songwriter, frontman of Swervedriver
 Adam Franz (1680–1732), 3rd Prince of Schwarzenberg
 Adam Fraser (1871 – after 1985), Scottish footballer
 Adam Frazier (born 1991), American baseball player
 Adam Freeland, English record producer and DJ
 Adam Freeman-Pask (born 1985), British rower
 Adam Freier (born 1980), Australian rugby union footballer
 Adam Frelin (born 1973), American artist, sculptor, photographer, and performer
 Adam Freytag (1608–1650), Polish engineer
 Adam Friedel (1780–1868), Danish soldier, philhellene, and buccaneer
 Adam Frizzell (born 1998), Scottish footballer
 Adam Froese (born 1991), Canadian field hockey player
 Adam Froman (born 1987), American football player
 Adam Frost (born 1969), British garden designer
 Adam Frost (born 1972), British author
 Adam Fry (born 1985), English footballer
 Adam Frye (born 1974), American soccer player
 Adam Fulara (born 1977), Polish guitarist
 Adam Fuller (born 1990), United States Virgin Islands footballer
 Adam Fuller, American football coach
 Adam Fullerton (born 1985), American lacrosse player
 Adam Kelso Fulton (1929–1994), Scottish rugby union player
 Adam Fuss (born 1961), British photographer

G 
 Adam Gabriel (born 2001), Czech footballer
 Adam Gachet, American Baptist minister, also known as Adam Gashet
 Adam Yahiye Gadahn (né Pearlman) (born 1978), American spokesman for al-Qaeda
 Adam Gaiser, American scholar of Islamic studies
 Adam Galinsky (born 1969), American social psychologist
 Adam Blue Galli, American criminal, a part of the "Preppie Bandits"
 Adam Galos (1924–2013), Polish historian and professor
 Adam Gamoran (born 1957), American sociologist
 Adam Garcia (born 1973), Australian actor and tap dancer
 Adam Gardiner (born 1966), New Zealand voice, film, and television actor
 Adam Gardiner, American politician
 Adam Gardner, lead guitarist for the rock band Guster
 Adam Garfinkle (born 1951), American historian, political scientist, and editor
 Adam Garton (born 1962), Australian rules footballer
 Adam Gase (born 1978), American football coach
 Adam Gatehouse (born c. 1950), English conductor, radio producer, and editor
 Adam Gates, American graphic designer and musician
 Adam Gaudette (born 1996), American ice hockey player
 Adam Gawlas (born 2002), Czech darts player
 Adam Gaynor (born 1963), American musician
 Adam Gazda (born 1987), American soccer player
 Adam Gazzaley (born 1968), American neuroscientist, author, photographer, entrepreneur, and inventor
 Adam Gaži (born 2003), Slovak footballer
 Adam Gdacius (1615–1688), Polish writer and Lutheran pastor
 Adam Geballe (born 1951), American microbiologist, scientist, and professor
 Adam Gee (born 1963), English interactive media and television producer and commissioner
 Adam Gee (born 1980), English golfer
 Adam Gee, Australian rugby league referee
 Adam Gemili (born 1993), British Olympic sprinter and footballer
 Adam Georgiev (born 1980), Czech poet and author
 Adam Germain, Canadian politician, lawyer, and judge
 Adam Gertler (born 1977/1978), American chef, television personality, and actor
 Adam Gerżabek (1898–1965), Polish painter
Adam Gettis (born 1988), American football player
 Adam Giambrone (born 1977), Canadian politician
 Adam Gib (1714–1788), Scottish religious leader and minister
 Adam Gibbs, American voice actor
 Adam Gibson (born 1986), Australian basketball player
 Adam Gidwitz (born 1982), American author
 Adam Gierasch, American filmmaker, known as a part of a husband-and-wife duo with his wife, Jace Anderson
 Adam Gierek (born 1938), Polish politician
 Adam Gifford, Lord Gifford (1820–1887), Scottish advocate and judge
 Adam Gilchrist (born 1971), Australian cricketer
 Adam Giles (born 1973), Australian politician, Chief Minister of the Northern Territory from 2013 to 2016
 Adam Gillen (born 1985), British actor
 Adam Gillies, Lord Gillies (1760–1842), Scottish judge
 Adam Gilljam (born 1990), Swedish bandy player
 Adam Gimbel (1817–1896), Bavarian-American businessman
 Adam Ginning (born 2000), Swedish ice hockey player
 Adam Ginter, Polish sprint canoer
 Adam Girard de Langlade Mpali (born 2002), Gabonese swimmer
 Adam Gitsham (born 1978), Australian sports shooter
 Adam Scott Glancy, American author and game designer
 Adam Glapiński (born 1950), Polish economist and politician
 Adam Glass (born 1968), American comic book writer, screenwriter, and television producer
 Adam Glauer (1875–1945?), German occultist and spy, also known as Rudolf von Sebottendorf
 Adam Gledhill (born 1993), British rugby league footballer
 Adam Glen (1853–1937), New Zealand cricketer
 Adam John Glossbrenner (1810–1889), American politician
 Adam Glyn (born 1984), American comedian and cameraman
 Adam Gnade, American musician and author
 Adam Gnezda Čerin (born 1999), Slovenian footballer
 Adam Gock, Australian composer, creative director, and music entrepreneur
 Adam Godley (born 1964), English actor
 Adam Gold, American musician of the rock band The Mendoza Line
 Adam Goldberg (born 1970), American actor, director, producer and musician
 Adam Goldberg (born 1980), American football player
 Adam F. Goldberg (born 1976), American television and film producer and writer
 Adam Golde (died 1395/1396), English politician
 Adam Goldman (born 1973), American journalist
 Adam Samuel Goldman, American composer, music producer, and artist
 Adam Goldstein (1973–2009), American DJ and musician, known as DJ AM, member of rap rock band Crazy Town
 Adam Goldstein (born 1988), American author and businessman
 Adam Goldworm (born 1978), American literary and talent manager, film producer, and businessman
 Adam Goljan (born 2001), Slovak footballer
 Adam Gollner (born 1976), Canadian writer and musician
 Adam Gomez, American politician
 Adam Gomola (born 1972), Polish ski mountaineer
 Adam Gondvi (1947–2011), Indian poet
 Adam Gontier (born 1978), musician and former lead singer of Canadian alternative rock band Three Days Grace
 Adam Gonšenica (born 1999), Slovak slalom canoer
 Adam Goode (born 1983), American politician
 Adam Goodes (born 1980), Australian rules football player
 Adam Goodheart, American historian, essayist, and author
 Adam Goodman, American film industry executive, television producer, and film producer
 Adam Gopnik (born 1956), American writer
 Adam Gordon (1831–1876), Canadian politician
 Adam Gordon of Auchindoun (1545–1580), Scottish soldier and knight
 Adam Lindsay Gordon (1833–1870), Australian poet, jockey and politician
 Lord Adam Gordon (1726–1801), Scottish career army officer
 Lord Adam Gordon (1909–1984), British royal courtier
 Adam Goren (born 1975), American musician, known professionally as Atom and His Package
 Adam Gorgoni (born 1963), American film and television composer
Adam Gotsis (born 1992), Australian American football player
Adam Goucher (born 1975), American cross-country and track and field runner
Adam Stanisław Grabowski (1698–1766), Polish Bishop
Adam Grace (born 1975), American author, magician, and musician, founder of the rock band Truth & Salvage Co.
Adam Grad (1969–2015), Polish footballer
Adam Graessle (born 1984), American football punter
Adam Grahn (born 1984), Swedish rock singer, songwriter, guitarist, and frontman for the rock band Royal Republic
 Adam Granduciel, American singer and guitarist, frontman of The War on Drugs
Adam Grant (born 1981), American popular science author and professor
 Adam Graves (born 1968), Canadian ice hockey player
 Adam Gray, American politician
 Adam Green (born 1975), American film director, producer, writer and actor
 Adam Green (born 1981), American musician
 Adam Green (born 1984), English footballer
 Adam Green, American theater critic and comedian
 Adam Greenberg (born 1939), Polish-born cinematographer
 Adam Greenberg (born 1981), American baseball player
 Adam Greendale (born 1988), English rugby union player
 Adam Greenfield, American writer and urbanist
 Adam W. Greenway, American Southern Baptist ministers
 Adam Gregg (born 1983), American lawyer and politician
 Adam Gregory (born 1985), Canadian country singer-songwriter
 Adam Gregory (born 1987), American actor
 Adam Griffin (born 1984), English footballer
Adam Griffith (born 1978), Australian cricketer
Adam Griffith, American football placekicker
 Adam Griffiths (born 1979), Australian footballer
 Adam Griger (born 2004), Slovak footballer
 Adam Grinwis (born 1992), American soccer player
 Adam Remigiusz Grocholski (1888–1965), Polish Army Lieutenant Colonel
 Adam Gross (born 1986), English-Welsh footballer
 Adam Growe (born 1967), Canadian comedian, cab driver, and game show host
 Adam Gruca (1893–1983), Polish orthopaedist, inventor, and surgeon
 Adam Grzymała-Siedlecki (1876–1967), Polish literary and theater critic, playwright, translator, prose writer, and director
Adam Grünewald (1902–1945), German SS officer and Nazi concentration camp commandant
Adam Gubman (born 1979), American songwriter, arranger, and composer
 Adam Guettel (born 1964), American composer and lyricist
 Adam Gumpelzhaimer (1559–1625), Bavarian composer and music theorist
 Adam Gunn (1872–1935), Scottish-American decathlete
 Adam Gunthorpe (born 1983), Australian cricketer
 Adam Gurowski (1805–1866), Polish-American author
 Adam Gussow (born 1958), American scholar, memoirist, and blues harmonica player
 Adam Gutstein, American businessman
 Adam Guziński (born 1970), Polish film director and screenwriter
 Adam Gwon, American composer and lyricist

H 
Adam Haayer (born 1977), American football player
Adam Habib (born 1965), South African academic administrator
Adam Hadwin (born 1987), Canadian golfer
Adam Hagara (born 2006), Slovak figure skater
Adam Hague (born 1997), English pole vaulter
Adam Hakeem (born 1997), Singaporean footballer
Adam Hałaciński (born 1962), Polish diplomat and former ambassador to Sweden
Adam Halbur, American poet
Adam Haldane-Duncan, 2nd Earl of Camperdown (1812–1867), British nobleman and politician
 Adam Hall (born 1980), American ice hockey player
 Adam Hall (born 1987), New Zealand para-alpine skier
 Adam Hall (born 1996), Scottish badminton player
 Adam Hall, pseudonym used by British novelist and playwright Elleston Trevor (1920–1995)
 Adam de la Halle (1237?–1288? or after 1306), French-born trouvère, poet and musician, also known as Adam le Bossu
Adam Haluska (born 1983), American basketball player
Adam Hamari (born 1983), American baseball umpire
Adam Hambrick (born 1985), American country singer-songwriter
Adam Hamdy (born 1974), British novelist, screenwriter, and film producer
 Adam Hamilton (1880–1952), New Zealand politician, leader of the National Party
 Adam Hamilton (born 1964), American minister
 Adam Hamilton, American music producer, songwriter, and session musician
 Adam Hamm (born 1971), American politician, former North Dakota Insurance Commissioner
 Adam Hammill (born 1988), English footballer
 Adam Handling (born 1988), British chef and restaurateur
 Adam Hanft, American brand strategist, blogger, and copywriter
Ádám Hanga (born 1989), Hungarian basketball player
Adam Hanieh, British academic
Adam Hann-Byrd (born 1982), American actor and screenwriter
 Adam Hansen (born 1981), Australian road bicycle racer
 Adam Hanuszkiewicz (1924–2011), Polish actor and theatre director
 Adam Harasiewicz (born 1932), Polish classical concert pianist
 Adam Harding (born 1993), Welsh ice hockey player
 Adam Hardy (born 1953), British architect, historian, and professor
 Adam Hardy (born 1983), South African footballer
 Adam Hargreaves (born 1964), English author and illustrator
 Adam Harper, English mathematician and professor
Adam Harrington (born 1978), American voice actor
Adam Harrington (born 1980), American basketball player and coach
Adam J. Harrington (born 1972), Canadian-American actor and producer
Adam Harris (born 1975), American politician
Adam Harris (born 1987), American sprinter
 Adam Harrison (born 1985), Welsh cricketer
 Adam Jay Harrison (born 1973), American entrepreneur, inventor, and military acquisition reform advocate
 Adam Hart, English scientist, author, and broadcaster
 Adam Hart-Davis (born 1943), English scientist, author, photographer, historian, and broadcaster
 Adam Hartle (born 1979), American stand-up comedian
 Adam Hartlett (born 1986), Australian rules footballer
 Adam Harvey (born 1974), Australian country music singer
 Adam Harvey (born 1981), American artist and researcher
 Adam Paul Harvey (born 1984), English actor
 Adam Haseley (born 1996), American baseball player
 Adam Haslett (born 1970), American fiction writer and journalist
 Adam Haslmayr (1562–1630), German writer
 Adam Hasner (born 1969), American attorney and politician
 Adam Hastings (born 1996), Scottish rugby union player
 Adam Hattersley (born 1978), American politician and author
 Adam Hauser (born 1980), American ice hockey goaltender
 Adam Havlík (born 1991), Czech ice hockey player
 Adam Hawkes (1605–1672), English immigrant and American settler
 Adam Hawkins (born 1976), American recording and mix engineer
 Adam Hawley, American contemporary pop guitarist
 Adam Hay (after 1684–1775), Scottish officer in the British Army and politician
 Sir Adam Hay, 7th Baronet (1795–1867), Scottish baronet and politician
 Adam Hayden (born 1977), Australian rugby league footballer
Adam Hayward (born 1984), American football player
Adam Haywood (1875–1932), English footballer
Adam Healey (born 1974), Italian internet entrepreneur and businessman
Adam Heather (born 1972), English cricketer
Adam Heidt (born 1977), American luger
Adam Helcelet (born 1991), Czech athlete
Adam Helewka (born 1995), Canadian ice hockey player
Adam Helfant, American businessman
Adam Hellborg (born 1998), Swedish footballer
Adam Heller (born 1933), Iraeli-American scientist and engineer
Adam Helliker, English journalist and columnist
 Adam Helmer (c. 1754–1830), American Revolutionary War hero, also known as John Helmer or Hans Helmer
 Adam Helms (born 1974), American contemporary artist
 Adam Hemati (born 1995), Iranian-Canadian footballer
 Adam Hemmeon (1788–1867), Canadian politician
 Adam Hendershott (born 1983), American actor
 Adam Henderson (1873–after 1901), English footballer
 Adam Henderson, British musician and founding member of the English goth band, Inkubus Sukkubus
 Adam Henein (1929–2020), Egyptian sculptor
 Adam Henley (born 1994), Welsh-American footballer
 Adam Henrich (born 1984), Canadian ice hockey player
 Adam Henrique (born 1990), Canadian ice hockey player
 Adam Henry (born 1972), American football player and coach
 Adam Henry (born 1974), American artist
 Adam Henry (born 1991), New Zealand rugby league footballer
 Adam Henson (born 1966), English farmer, author, and television presenter
 Adam Hepburn, 2nd Earl of Bothwell (c.1492–1513), Scottish nobleman
 Adam Hepburn of Craggis (died 1513), Scottish nobleman, killed in action at Flodden Field
 Adam Hepburn, Lord Humbie (c. 1600–1656), Scottish judge, politician, and soldier
 Adam Hepburn, Master of Hailes (after 1432–1479), Scottish nobleman
 Adam Herbert (born 1943), American academic administrator
 Adam Hertz, American politician
 Adam Herz (born 1972), American screenwriter and producer
 Adam Herzog (1829–1895), Swiss politician
 Adam Hess (born 1981), American-German basketball player
 Adam Hess, British comedian and writer
 Adam Kaspar Hesselbach (1788–1856), German surgeon and anatomist
 Adam Heuskes (born 1976), Australian rules footballer
 Adam Heydel (1893–1941), Polish economist and politician
 Adam Hickey (born 1997), English cricketer
 Adam Hicks (born 1992), American actor, rapper, singer and songwriter
 Adam Higginbotham (born 1968), British journalist
 Adam Highfield (born 1981), New Zealand goalkeeper
 Adam Higson (born 1987), English rugby league footballer
 Adam Hildreth (born 1985), British entrepreneur
 Adam Hill (born 1986), New Zealand rugby union player
 Adam Hills (1880–1941), English politician
 Adam Hills (born 1970), Australian comedian and TV presenter
 Adam G. Hinds, American politician
 Adam Hinshelwood (born 1984), English footballer and manager
 Adam Hiorth (1816–1871), Norwegian merchant and industrial pioneer
 Adam Hiorth (1879–1961), Norwegian barrister and playwright
 Adam Hlobus (born 1958), Belarus writer, novelist, essayist, poet, publisher, and artist
 Adam Hloušek (born 1988), Czech footballer
 Adam Hložek (born 2002), Czech footballer
 Adam Hmam (born 1994), Tunisian table tennis player
 Adam Hobbs (born 1993), American soccer player
 Adam Hochberg, American radio correspondent
 Adam C. Hochfelder (born 1971), American real estate executive and businessman
 Adam Hochschild (born 1942), American author, journalist and lecturer
 Adam Hock (born 1964), American businessman
 Adam King Hodgins (1859–1932), Canadian businessman and politician
 Adam Hodgson (1788–1862), English merchant
 Adam Hofman (born 1980), Polish public relations professional and politician
 Adam Hofstedt (born 2002), Swedish alpine skier
 Adam Hogg (born 1934), Scottish footballer
 Adam Holender (born 1937), Polish cinematographer
 Adam Holland (born 1971), American rower
 Adam Holland (born 1987), English distance runner
 Adam Hollander (1964–1984), American film and television actor
 Adam Hollanek (1922–1998), Polish science fiction writer and journalist
 Adam Hollier, American politician
 Adam Hollingsworth, American politician
 Adam Hollioake (born 1971), Australian cricketer, mixed martial artist and boxer
 Adam Holloway, British politician
 Adam Holmes (born 1967), American politician and businessman
 Adam Holzman (born 1958), American jazz keyboardist
 Adam Holzman (born 1960), American classical guitarist
 Adam Hood, American singer-songwriter
 Adam Hootnick, American film and television producer and director
 Adam Hope (1813–1882), Canadian businessman and politician
 Adam Hope (1834–1916), Australian cricketer
 Adam Grant Horne (1829–1901), Canadian politician and businessman
 Adam Horovitz (born 1966), aka Ad-Rock, member of the Beastie Boys
 Adam Horovitz (born 1971), British poet
 Adam Horowitz (born 1971), American screenwriter and producer
 Adam Hose (born 1992), English cricketer
 Adam Hostetter (born 1974), American snowboarder
 Adam Houghton (died 1389), English Bishop
 Adam Houlihan (born 1978), Australian rules football player
 Adam Housley (born 1971), American journalist, baseball player, and winery owner
 Adam Coleman Howard, American actor, screenwriter, and film director
 Adam Howden (born 1983), English actor
 Adam Hrycaniuk (born 1984), Polish basketball player
 Adam Hsu (born 1941), Chinese martial artist and essayist, known as Xu Ji in China
 Adam Hubble (born 1986), Australian tennis player
 Adam Huber (born 1987), American actor and model
 Adam Huckle (born 1971), Zimbabwean cricketer
 Adam Hudspeth (1836–1890), Canadian lawyer and politician
 Adam Hugh, American table tennis player
 Adam Hughes (born 1967), American comic book artist and illustrator
 Adam Hughes (born 1977), English rugby league and rugby union footballer
 Adam Hughes (born 1982), Australian footballer
 Adam Hughes (born 1982), American poet
 Adam Hughes (born 1986), American volleyball coach
 Adam Hughes (born 1990), Welsh rugby union player
 Adam Humer (1908/1917–2001), Polish activist and politician
 Adam Humphreys (born 1982), Canadian filmmaker and entrepreneur
Adam Humphries (born 1993), American football player
Adam Hunt (born 1993), English darts player
Adam Hunter (1908–1991), British politician
Adam Hunter (1963–2011), Scottish golfer
Adam Hunter (born 1981), Australian rules footballer
Adam Mitchell Hunter (1871–1955), Scottish minister, mathematician, astronomer, and author
Adam Huntsman (1786–1849), American lawyer and politician
Adam Hurrey (born 1983), British journalist, author, and podcaster
Adam Hurynowicz (1869–1894), Belarusian poet and folklorist
Adam Húska (born 1997), Slovak ice hockey goaltender
Adam Huss (born 1977), American television and film actor, producer, and writer
Adam Hyeronimus, Australian jockey
Adam Hyler (1735–1782), German privateer and whaleboat captain
Adam Charlap Hyman (born 1989), American architect, designer, and artist
Adam Hyzdu (born 1971), American baseball player

I 
 Adam Iacobucci (born 1986), Australian rules footballer
 Adam Idah (born 2001), Irish footballer
 Adam Imer (born 1989), Brazilian field hockey player
 Adam Inglis (born 1929), Australia rules footballer
 Adam Ingram (born 1947), Scottish politician
 Adam Ingram (born 1951), Scottish politician
 Adam Irigoyen (born 1997), American actor, singer, rapper and dancer
 Adam Ismailov (born 1976), Russian footballer
 Adam Itzel Jr. (1864–1893), American conductor and composer
 Adam Iwiński (1958–2010), Polish film director, cinematographer, and actor

J 
 Adam Jabiri (born 1984), German footballer
 Adam Jackson (1929–1989), Irish greyhound trainer
 Adam Jackson (born 1994), English footballer
 Adam Jacobs (born c. 1984), American actor and singer
 Adam B. Jaffe (born 1955), American freelance economist
 Adam Jahn (born 1991), American soccer player
 Adam Jakobsen (born 1999), Danish footballer
 Adam Jakubech (born 1997), Slovak football goalkeeper
 Adam Jala (born 1979), Filipino politician
 Adam James (born 1972), English actor
 Adam James, Australian country singer and television host
 Adam Jameson (1860–1907), Scottish physician
 Adam Jamieson (born 1996), Canadian racing cyclist
 Adam Janisch (born 1975), English cricketer
 Adam Jankowski (born 1948), Austrian painter and professor
 Adam Jánoš (born 1992), Czech footballer
 Adam Jánošík (born 1992), Slovak ice hockey player
 Adam Janowski (born 1987), English rugby league footballer
 Adam Jansen, American state archivist for Hawaii
 Adam Jarchow (born 1978), American attorney and politician
 Adam Jarubas (born 1974), Polish politician
 Adam Jarzębski (c. 1590 – c. 1648), Polish composer, violinist, poet, and writer
 Adam Jastrzebski (born 1980), Polish painter, performer, art curator, and theoretician
 Adam Jasinski (born 1978), winner of the season 9 of the U.S. TV series Big Brother
 Adam Jeffery (born 1971), Australian lawn bowler
 Adam Jeffries, American actor
 Adam Jelonek (born 1968), Polish political scientist and professor
Adam Jennings (born 1982), American football player
 Adam Jentleson, American writer and political commentator
 Adam Jezierski (born 1990), Polish actor
 Adam Johansson (born 1983), Swedish footballer
 Adam Byström Johansson (born 1996), Swedish ice hockey player
 Adam Johnson (1834–1922), American frontiersman and Confederate officer, known as Stovepipe Johnson
 Adam Johnson (born 1965), British judge
 Adam Johnson (born 1967), American novelist and short story writer
 Adam Johnson (born 1976), American electronic musician
 Adam Johnson (born 1978), English cricketer
 Adam Johnson (born 1979), American baseball pitcher
 Adam Johnson (born 1987), English footballer
 Adam Johnson (born 1994), American ice hockey player
 Adam Johnson, British classical pianist and conductor
 Adam Johnson, Welsh classical singer, half of Richard & Adam
 Adam R. Johnson, American politician
 Adam Joinson (born 1970), British author, academic, and public speaker
 Adam Jones (born 1963), British-Canadian scientist, writer, and photojournalist
 Adam Jones (born 1965), American musician and visual artist, guitarist for the rock band Tool
 Adam Jones (born 1980), English racing driver
 Adam Jones (born 1980), Welsh rugby union player
 Adam Jones (born 1981), Welsh rugby union player
 Adam Jones (born 1983), American football player, known on the field as Pacman Jones
 Adam Jones (born 1985), American baseball player
 Adam Jones (born 1989), Canadian lacrosse player
 Adam Jones (born 1993), Welsh rugby union referee
 Adam Garnet Jones, Canadian filmmaker and screenwriter
 Adam Joseph (born 1982), American singer-songwriter and music producer
 Adam Juratovac (born 1987), American football player and attorney
 Adam Juretzko (born 1971), German wrestler
 Adam Jury, Canadian game designer and graphic designer

K 
 Adam Kącki (born 1998), Polish volleyball player
 Adam Kaczmarek (born 1961), Polish sports shooter
 Adam Tauman Kalai, American computer scientist
 Adam Kaloustian, American television producer
 Adam Kamani (born 1989), British businessman
 Adam Kaminski (born 1984), Canadian volleyball player
 Adam Kamis (born 1979), Singaporean para-athlete and motivational speaker, also known as Adam1AR
 Adam Kane (born 1968), American cinematographer, film director, television director, and producer
 Adam Kantor (born 1986), American actor and singer
 Adam Kappacher (born 1993), Austrian freestyle skier
 Adam Karabec (born 2003), Czech footballer
 Adam Kardasz (born 1983), Polish footballer
 Adam Karrillon (1853–1938), German writer and physician
 Adam Kasper, American record producer and engineer
 Adam Kassen (born 1974),  American independent film director, actor, writer and producer
 Adam Katz, American lawyer and sports agent
 Adam Kaufman (born 1974), American actor
 Adam Kay (born 1980), British comedy writer, author, comedian, and doctor
 Adam Kay (born 1992), English footballer
 Adam Kaye (born 1968), British businessman and restaurateur
 Adam Kazanowski (born c. 1599–1649), Polish-Lithuanian noble
Adam Keefe (born 1970), American basketball player
Adam Keefe (born 1984), Canadian ice hockey player
Adam Keel (1924–2018), Swiss artist
Adam Keighran (born 1997), Australian rugby league footballer
 Adam Keller (born 1955), Israeli peace activist
 Adam Kellerman (born 1990), Australian wheelchair tennis player
 Ádám Kellner (born 1986), Hungarian tennis player
 Adam Stephen Kelly (born 1990), British director, screenwriter, producer, and journalist
 Adam Kelwick, British Muslim chaplain and humanitarian aid worker
 Adam Kemp (born 1990), American basketball player
 Adam Kempton (born 1957), Australian politician
 Adam Kendall, visual artist for the band Neurosis from 1990 to 1993
 Adam Kendon (born 1934), British linguist
 Adam Kendrick (born 1969), British actor, also known as Adamo Palladino
 Adam Kennedy (1922–1997), American actor, screenwriter, novelist, and painter
 Adam Kennedy (born 1976), American baseball player
 Adam Kennedy (born 1983), Australian tennis player
 Adam Kennedy (born 1991), American football player
 Adam Kennedy (born 1992), Australian rules footballer
 Adam Kensy (born 1956), Polish footballer and manager
 Adam Kerinaiua (born 1974), Australian rules footballer
 Adam Kershen, Canadian DJ and music producer, half of the duo known as Adam K & Soha
 Adam Kersten (1930–1983), Polish historian
 Adam Kessel (1866–1946), American film company executive
 Adam Khaki, 14th-century Muslim saint
 Adam Khan (born 1985), British racing driver
 Adam Khoo (born 1974), Singaporean entrepreneur, author, and educator
 Adam Khudoyan (1921–2000), Armenian composer
 Adam Kidan (born 1964), American businessman
 Adam Kidron, British-born music producer and entrepreneur, managing partner of 4food
 Adam Kieft (born 1982), American football player
 Adam Kilgarriff (1960–2015), English corpus linguist, lexicographer, and author
 Adam Kimber (born 1969), Australian judge and politician
 Adam Kimbisa, Tanzanian politician
 Adam King (1783–1835), American politician
 Adam King (born 1995), Scottish footballer
 Adam King (born 1999), English cricketer
 Adam Kingsley (born 1975), Australian rules footballer
 Adam Kingwande (born 1989), Tanzanian footballer
 Adam Kinzinger (born 1978), U.S. Representative (R-IL)
 Adam Kirby (born 1988), British jockey
 Adam Kirkor (1818–1886), Polish publisher, journalist, and archeologist
 Adam Kirsch (born 1976), American poet and literary critic
 Adam Kisiel (1580/1600–1653), Ruthenian nobleman
 Adam Klasfeld, American journalist and playwright
 Adam Kleczkowski (1883–1949), Polish philologist and professor
 Adam Kleeberger (born 1984), Canadian rugby union player
 Adam Klein (born 1960), American opera singer
 Adam Klein (born 1962), American writer and musician
 Adam Klein (born 1988), American swimmer
 Adam Klein (born 1991), contestant on the 33rd season of Survivor
 Adam Kline (born 1944), American politician
 Adam W. Kline (1818–1898), American manufacturer, banker, and politician
 Adam Kloffenstein (born 2000), American professional baseball player
 Adam Kluger, American music manager and businessman
 Adam Klugman (born 1963), American media strategist and campaign consultant
 Adam Knight (born 1972), Australian art curator and dealer
 Adam Knioła (1911–1942), Polish footballer
 Adam Christopher Knuth (1687–1736), 1st Count of Knuthenborg
 Adam Koc (1891–1969), Polish politician, MP, soldier, journalist, and Freemason
 Adam Koch (born 1988), American basketball player
 Adam Adamandy Kochański (1631–1700), Polish mathematician, physicist, clock-maker, pedagogue, and librarian
 Adam Kocian (born 1995), German volleyball player
 Adam Koenig (born 1971), American politician
Adam Koets (born 1984), American football player
 Adam Kogut (1895–1940), Polish footballer
 Adam Kok III (1811–1875), South African politician
 Adam Kokesh (born 1982), American libertarian talk show host and activist
 Adam Kokoszka (born 1986), Polish footballer
 Adam Kolarek (born 1989), American baseball pitcher
 Adam Kolasa (born 1975), Polish pole vaulter
 Adam Kolawa (1957–2011), American businessman
 Adam František Kollár (1718–1783), Slovak jurist and politician
 Adam Ignacy Komorowski (1699–1759), Polish archbishop
 Adam Kompała (born 1973), Polish footballer
 Adam Konar (born 1993), Canadian football player
 Adam Končić (born 1968), Croatian singer and actor
 Adam Kopas (born 1999), Slovak footballer
 Adam Kopczyński (1948–2021), Polish ice hockey player
 Adam Koppy (1973–2013), American mechanical engineer
 Adam Kopyciński (1907–1982), Polish conductor and composer
 Adam Korczyk (born 1995), Australian rugby union player
 Adam Korol (born 1974), Polish rower and politician
 Adam Korson, Canadian actor
 Adam Kossowski (1905–1986), Polish artist
 Adam Kotsko (born 1980), American theologian, religious scholar, culture critic, and translator
 Adam Kotzmann (born 1993), Czech alpine skier
 Adam Kovacevich, American lobbyist and businessman
 Adam Kowalczyk (born 1975), American musician
 Adam Kowalski (1912–1971), Polish ice hockey player
 Adam Kowalski (born 1994), Polish volleyball player
 Adam Kownacki (born 1989), Polish boxer
 Adam Kozák (born 1999), Czech volleyball player
 Adam Kozłowiecki (1911–2007), Zambian Archbishop
 Adam Kraft (c. 1460–1509), German sculptor and master builder
 Adam Krajewski (1929–2000), Polish fencer
 Adam August Krantz (1809–1872), German mineralogist
 Adam Stanisław Krasiński (1714–1800), Polish noble
 Adam Kraus (born 1984), American football player
 Adam Krčík (born 1996), Slovak footballer
 Adam Kreek (born 1980), Canadian author, businessman, and rower
 Adam Krieger (1634–1666), German composer
 Adam Krijanovski, Russian politician
 Adam Krikorian (born 1974), American water polo coach
 Adam Królikiewicz (1894–1966), Polish horse rider and Army major
 Adam Krug (born 1983), American ice hockey player and coach
 Adam Krupa (born 1952), Polish footballer
 Adam Krupski (1706–1748), Polish professor, philosopher, and priest
 Adam Krzemiński (born 1945), Polish journalist ad commentator
 Adam Krzesiński (born 1965), Polish fencer
 Adam Krzysztofiak (1951–2008), Polish ski jumper
 Adam Krzyzak, Canadian computer engineer
 Adam Książek (born 1967), Polish footballer
 Adam Kszczot (born 1989), Polish middle-distance runner
 Adam Kuban (born 1974), American blogger, editor, and publisher
 Adam Kubert (born 1959), American comic book artist
 Adam Kuby (born 1961), American sculptor, visual artist, and landscape designer
 Adam Kuckhoff (1887–1943), German writer, journalist, and German resistance member
 Adam Kucz (born 1971), Polish footballer
 Adam Kuhlman, American animation director
 Adam Kuhn (1741–1817), American physician, naturalist, and professors
 Adam Kułach (born 1965), Polish diplomat
 Adam Kuligowski (born 1955), Polish chess master
 Adam Kunkel (born 1981), Canadian hurdler
 Adam Kunkel (born 1999), American basketball player
 Adam Kuper (born 1941), South African anthropologist
 Adam Kurak (born 1985), Russian wrestler
 Adam Kury (born 1969), American bassist and vocalist
 Adam Kwasman (born 1982), American attorney and politician
 Adam Kwasnik (born 1983), Australian footballer

L 
 Adam Lach (born 1983), Polish photographer
 Adam LaClave, American musician and singer
 Adam Lacko (born 1984), Czech racing driver
 Adam Laczkó (born 1997), Slovak footballer
 Adam Lallana (born 1988), English footballer
 Adam Lam (born 1987), Israeli footballer
 Adam Lamberg (born 1984), American actor
 Adam Lambert (born 1982), American singer
 Adam Lambert (born 1997), Australian snowboarder
 Adam Lamhamedi (born 1995), Moroccan-Canadian alpine skier
 Adam Leroy Lane (born 1964), American convicted murderer, dubbed as the Highway Killer
 Adam Lange (born 1979), Australian rules footballer
 Adam Langer (born 1967), American author
 Adam Lanza (1992–2012), American spree killer, perpetrator of the 2012 Sandy Hook Elementary School shooting
 Adam I. Lapidus (born 1963), American television writer
 Adam LaRoche (born 1979), American baseball player
 Adam Larsson (born 1992), Swedish ice hockey player
 Adam LaVorgna (born 1981), American actor
 Adam Laxman (1766–1806?), Finnish military officer, emissary to Japan
 Adam Lazzara (born 1981), lead singer of Taking Back Sunday
 Adam Leavy (born 1995), Irish rugby union player
 Adam Leber (born 1977), American talent manager, entrepreneur, and investor
 Adam LeBor, British author, journalist, writing coach, and editor
 Adam Lebovitz, American film and television producer
 Adam Ledgeway (born 1970), British academic linguist
 Adam Ledwoń (1974–2008), Polish footballer
 Adam S. Lee (born 1968), American politician
 Adam LeFevre (born 1950), American character actor, poet and playwright
 Adam Le Fondre (born 1986), English footballer
 Adam Legzdins (born 1986), English footballer goalkeeper
 Adam Lehan, British musician
 Adam Leibovich (born 1970), American theoretical physicist
 Adam P. Leighton (1851–1922), American politician
 Adam Leipzig (born 1958), American film and theatre producer, author, and businessman
 Adam Franz Lennig (1803–1866), German Catholic theologian
 Adam Leon, American film director and writer
 Adam Leonard (born 1986), American gridiron football player
 Adam Leonard, English singer-songwriter
 Adam Lepa (1939–2022), Polish Roman Catholic prelate
 Adam Lerner, American businessman and museum curator
 Adam Lerrick, American economist and politician
 Adam Lesage (fl. 1683), French occultist and alleged sorcerer
 Adam Leszczyński (born 1975), Polish historian, journalist, and professor
 Adam Leventhal (born 1979), English television presenter and journalist
 Adam Leventhal (born 1979), American software engineer
 Adam Levin (born 1976/1977), American fiction author
 Adam K. Levin, American politician, author, and podcast host
 Adam Levine (born 1969), American politician
 Adam Levine (born 1979), American lead singer and guitarist of Maroon 5
 Adam Levy (born 1966), jazz guitarist and freelance journalist
 Adam Levy (born 1970), British actor
 Adam Ludwig Lewenhaupt (1659–1719), Swedish general
 Adam Lewis (born 1999), English footballer
 Adam Lewis, British composer, songwriter, and producer, also known as Mr Ronz
 Adam Liaw (born 1978), Malaysian-Australian chef, television presenter, and author
 Adam Liberatore (born 1987), American baseball pitcher
 Adam Lightstone, Canadian politician
 Adam Lile (1885–1954), New Zealand rugby footballer
 Adam Lilling (born 1970), American entrepreneur
 Adam Lind (born 1983), American baseball player
 Adam Lindemann, American investor, writer, art collector, and art dealer
 Adam Lindsay, American businessman
 Adam Ling (born 1991), New Zealand rower
Adam Lingner (born 1960), American football player
Adam Lipčák (born 1997), Slovak footballer
Adam Lipiński, Polish economist, editor, and lecturer
 Adam Lippes (born 1972), American fashion designer, founded ADAM fashion label
 Adam Liptak (born 1960), American legal journalist
 Adam Lisagor (born 1978), American commercial director and businessman
 Adam Lisewski (born 1944), Polish fencer
 Adam Liška (born 1999), Slovak ice hockey player
 Adam C. Listman (1859–1943), American clothing cutter and politician
 Adam Liszt (1776–1827), Danube-Swabian musician
 Adam Litovitz (1982–2019), Canadian musician and composer
 Adam Little (1919–2008), Scottish footballer
 Adam Brown Littlepage (1859–1921), American lawyer and politician
 Adam Littleton (1627–1694), English cleric and lexicographer
 Adam Lively (born 1961), British novelist
 Adam Livingston (c. 1723–1795), Scottish soldier and politician
 Adam Livingstone (born 1998), Scottish footballer
 Adam Lizakowski (born 1956), Polish poet, translator, and photographer
 Adam Locke (born 1970), English footballer
 Adam Lockwood (born 1981), English footballer
 Adam Loewen (born 1984), Canadian baseball player
 Adam Loftus (1533–1605), Irish archbishop
 Adam Loftus, Irish politician and public official
 Adam Loftus, 1st Viscount Loftus (c. 1568–1643), Irish peer
 Adam Loftus, 1st Viscount Lisburne (1647–1691), Anglo-Irish peer and military commander
 Adam Logan (born 1975), Canadian mathematician and Scrabble player
 Adam London (born 1988), English cricketer
 Adam Long (born 1987), American golfer
 Adam Long (born 1991), British actor
 Adam Long (born 2000), Manx footballer
 Adam Long, American actor, screenwriter, and director
 Adam Lonicer (1528–1586), German botanist, also known as Adam Lonitzer or Adamus Lonicerus
 Adam Loomis (born 1992), American-Nordic combined skier
 Adam Lopez (born 1975), Australian pop musician, vocal coach, and session vocalist
 Adam Lorenc (born 1998), Polish volleyball player
 Adam Bhala Lough (born 1979), American film director, screenwriter, and documentary filmmaker
 Adam Lovatt (born 1999), English footballer
 Adam Lovell (born 1977), founder and owner of WriteAPrisoner.com
 Adam Lovelock (born 1982), Australian boxer
 Adam Lowe (born 1985), British writer, performer, and publisher
 Adam Lowitt, American stand-up comedian, co-executive producer, and supervising producer
 Adam Lowry (born 1993), Canadian ice hockey player
 Adam Lucas (born 1983), Australian swimmer
 Adam Edward Ludy (1831–1910), American Civil War veteran
 Adam Lundegard (born 2003), American soccer player
 Adam Lundgren (born 1986), Swedish actor
 Adam Lundqvist (born 1994), Swedish footballer
 Adam Lupel (born 1970), American writer
 Adam Lux (1765–1793), German revolutionary and sympathiser
 Adam Lyons (born 1981), American entrepreneur and businessman
 Adam Lyth (born 1987), English cricketer

M 
 Adam MacDougall (born 1975), Australian rugby league footballer
 Adam MacKenzie (born 1984), Scottish field hockey defender
 Adam Macrow (born 1978), Australian racing driver
 Adam Maher (born 1993), Dutch footballer
 Adam Maida (born 1930), Cardinal Archbishop Emeritus of Detroit
 Adam Mair (born 1979), Canadian former professional hockey player
 Adam Makowicz (born 1940), Polish-Canadian pianist and composer, born Adam Matyszkowicz
 Adam Malik (1917–1984), Indonesia's third vice president
 Adam Gale Malloy (1830–1911), Irish-American politician and U.S. Army officer
 Adam Małysz (born 1977), Polish ski jumper and rally racing driver
 Adam Gerard Mappa (1754–1828), Dutch type-founder, Patriot, and active colonel
 Adam Marsh (c. 1200–18 November 1259), English Franciscan, scholar and theologian, also known as Adam de Marisco
 Adam Matthews (born 1992), Welsh footballer
 Adam J. Matzger, American chemist
 Adam McCune (born 1985), American novelist
 Adam McDonough (born 1985), American mixed martial artist
 Adam Gerrond McDougall (1836–1907), Canadian reeve
 Adam McGurk (born 1989), Northern Irish footballer
 Adam McKay (born 1968), American screenwriter, director and comedian
 Adam McPhee (born 1982),  Australian rules football player
Adam Meadows (born 1974), American football player
 Adam Messinger, Canadian songwriter, producer, and multi-instrumentalist, nicknamed "Messy", member of The Messengers production team
 Adam Frans van der Meulen (1632–1690), Flemish Baroque painter
 Adam Michnik (born 1946), Polish historian and former dissident
 Adam Mickiewicz (1798–1855), Polish poet
 Adam El Mihdawy (born 1989), American tennis player
 Adam Miller (born 1979), American painter
 Adam David Miller (1922–2020), American poet, writer, publisher, and radio programmer and producer
 Adam Lee Miller, American musician
 Adam S. Miller, American author
 Adam Moffat (born 1986), Scottish footballer
 Adam Mójta (born 1986), Polish footballer
Adam Mokoka (born 1998), French basketball player
 Adam Moleyns (died 1450), Bishop of Chichester, Lord Privy Seal
 Adam Gottlob Moltke (1710–1792), Danish courtier, statesman, and diplomat
 Adam Wilhelm Moltke (1785–1864), Danish nobleman, landowner, civil servant, and politician
 Adam Morrison (born 1984), American basketball player and coach
 Adam Egypt Mortimer, American director, comic writer, and producer
 Adam Morton (born 1945), Canadian philosopher 
 Adam Kelly Morton (born 1973), Canadian actor, writer, producer, and teacher, also known as Adam Kelly 
 Adam Pulchrae Mulieris, French writer 
 Adam Müller (1779–1829), German publicist, literary critic, political economist and theorist, Ritter von Nitterdorf
 Adam Müller-Guttenbrunn (1852–1923), Austrian author
 Adam August Müller (1811–1844), Danish history painter
 Adam Ali Musab (born 1995), Qatari middle-distance runner
 Adam Muto, American artist and director

N 

Adam Nagaitis, British actor
Adam Niedzielski (born 1973), Polish economist and government administrator
 Adam Ndlovu (1970–2012), Zimbabwean footballer
 Adam Neat (1976/1977–2019), Australian DJ, known professionally as Adam Sky
 Adam Albert von Neipperg (1775–1829), Austrian general and statesman
 Adam Nelson (born 1975), American shot putter
 Adam Nemec (born 1985), Slovak footballer
 Adam Zachary Newton, American academic
 Adam Nichols (musician) (born 1991), British musician
 Adam Nicolson (born 1957), British author
 Adam Nimoy (born 1956), American TV director, son of actor Leonard Nimoy
 Adam Nussbaum (born 1955), American jazz musician

O 

Adam Oates (born 1962), Canadian hockey player
 Adam Oehlenschläger (1779–1850), Danish poet
 Adam Friedrich Oeser (1717–1799), German etcher, painter, and sculptor
 Adam Ołdakowski (born 1955), Polish politician
 Adam Olearius (1599–1671), German scholar, mathematician, geographer and librarian, born Adam Ölschläger or Oehlschlaeger
 Adam Oller (born 1994), American baseball player
 Adam Ondra (born 1993), Czech rock climber
 Adam Orleton (died 1345), Bishop of Winchester
 Adam Osborne (1939–2003), author, publisher, and computer designer, founder of the Osborne Computer Corporation
 Adam Duff O'Toole (died 1328), Irish convict
 Adam Ottavino (born 1985), American baseball player
 Adam Otterburn of Auldhame and Reidhall (died 1548), Scottish lawyer and diplomat
 Adam Petrovich Ozharovsky (1776–1855), Russian general

P 
 Adam Page (born 1991), American wrestler whose real name is Stephen Woltz
 Adam Page (born 1992), American ice sled hockey player
 Adam Page (born 1997), English footballer
 Adam Paine (1843–1877), U.S. Army Indian scout
 Adam Pajer (born 1995), Czech footballer
 Adam Paljov (born 1970), Serbian politician
 Adam Pallin, American record producer, songwriter, and multi-instrumentalist, also known as 1-900
 Adam Pally (born 1982), American actor and comedian
 Adam Palma (born 1974), Polish-British guitarist and teacher
 Adam Pålsson, Swedish actor and musician
Adam Pankey (born 1994), American football player
Adam Papalia, Australian sports commentator
Adam Papée (1895–1990), Polish fencer
Adam Parada (born 1981), American-Mexican basketball player
 Adam Pardy (born 1984), Canadian ice hockey player
 Adam Parfitt (born 1974), Canadian rower
 Adam Parfrey (1957–2018), American journalist, editor, and the publisher of Feral House
 Adam Parker (born 1972), American prelate of the Roman Catholic Church
 Adam Parker (born 1973), New Zealand rugby union player
 Adam Parkhomenko (born 1985), American political strategist and organizer
 Adam Parkhouse (born 1992), Australian footballer
 Adam Parore (born 1971), New Zealand cricket player
 Adam Parr (born 1965), British businessman
 Adam Parsons (born 1970), English television and radio presenter
 Adam Parvipontanus (c. 1100–02 – c. 1157–1169), Anglo-Norman scholastic and churchman, also known as Adam of Balsham
 Adam Pascal (born 1970), American actor and singer
 Adam Pastor (d. 1560s), German Catholic priest
 Adam Patel, Baron Patel of Blackburn (1940–2019), British businessman and politician
 Adam Pattison (born 1986), Australian rules footballer
 Adam Pavlesic (born 2002), Australian football goalkeeper
 Adam Pavlásek (born 1994), Czech tennis player
 Adam Pawlikowski (1925–1976), Polish actor
 Adam Payerl (born 1991), Canadian ice hockey player
 Adam Payne (1781–1832), American itinerant minister
 Adam Payne (born 1970), American track cyclist and road bicycle racer
 Adam Pazio (born 1992), Polish footballer
 Adam Pearce (born 1978), American wrestler
 Adam Pearce (born 1997), Australian footballer
 Adam Pearlman (born 2005), South African footballer
 Adam Pearson (born 1964), English rugby league club team owner
 Adam Pearson (born 1985), British actor, presenter, and campaigner
 Adam Pearson, English guitarist for the band The Sisters of Mercy
 Adam Peaty (born 1994), English swimmer
 Adam Pecháček (born 1995), Czech basketball player
Adam Pecorari (born 1984), American racing driver
Adam Peek (born 1977), Australian rugby league footballer
Adam Pelech (born 1994), Canadian ice hockey player
Adam Peltzman, American television writer and producer
Adam Pendleton (born 1984), American conceptual artist
Adam Penenberg (born 1962), American journalist and educator
Adam Pengilly (born 1977), British skeleton racer
Adam Perelle (1640–1695), French artist and writer
 Adam Perry (born 1969), British musician, known by the stage name The Yin
 Adam Perry (born 1979), Australian rugby league footballer
 Adam Peška (born 1997), Czech paralympic athlete
 Adam Peterson (born 1965), American baseball pitcher
 Adam Peterson (born 1974), American tennis player
 Adam Peterson (born 1979), American baseball pitcher
 Adam Petersson (born 2000), Swedish footballer
 Adam Petri (1454–1527), German printer, publisher, and bookseller
 Adam Petrouš (born 1977), Czech footballer
 Adam Pettersson (born 1992), Swedish ice hockey player
 Ádám Pettik (born 1972), Hungarian musician, singer-songwriter, percussionist, and instrument creator
 Adam Pettle (born 1973), Canadian playwright, radio producer, and television writer
 Adam Petty (1980–2000), American race car driver
 Adam Pettyjohn (born 1977), American baseball pitcher
 Adam Phelan (born 1991), Australian racing cyclist
 Adam Philip (1856–1945), Scottish minister and author
 Adam Philippe, Comte de Custine (1740–1793), French general
 Adam Phillips (born 1954), British psychoanalytic psychotherapist and essayist
 Adam Phillips (born 1971), Australian filmmaker, animator, and freelancer
 Adam Phillips (born 1998), English footballer
 Adam Phillips, British musician
 Adam Piatt (born 1976), American baseball player
 Adam Piccolotti (born 1988), American mixed martial artist
 Adam Pickering (born 1981), Australian rules footballer and coach
 Adam Pierończyk (born 1970), Polish jazz saxophonist and composer
 Adam Pietrasik, Polish canoeist
 Adam Pietraszko (born 1982), Polish speedway racer
 Adam Piłsudski (1869–1935), Polish senator
 Adam Pilch (1965–2010), Polish Lutheran clergy and military chaplain
 Adam Pine (born 1976), Australian swimmer
 Adam Pineault (born 1986), American ice hockey player
 Adam Pinkhurst, English scribe
 Adam Pisoni, American entrepreneur and businessman
 Adam Plachetka (born 1985), Czech singer
 Adam Plack, Australian didgeridoo player, composer, and producer
 Adam Alfred Plater (1836–1909), Polish-Lithuanian noble and archaeologist
 Adam Platt (born 1958), American writer and restaurant critic
 Adam Plunkett (1903–1992), Scottish footballer
 Adam Plutko (born 1991), American baseball pitcher
 Adam Podgórecki (1925–1998), Polish sociologist
 Adam Podlesh (born 1983), American football player
 Adam Pœrtner (1817–1910), German-American mason, miller, and politician
 Adam Polášek (born 1991), Czech ice hockey player
 Adam Polkinghorne (born 1975), Australian cricket player
 Adam Pollina, American comic book artist and penciller
 Adam F. Poltl (1891–1969), American businessman and politician
 Adam Pompey (born 1998), New Zealand rugby league footballer
 Adam Poniński (1732/1733–1798), Polish nobleman and Prince
 Adam Poniński (1758–1816), Polish nobleman, Prince, politician, soldier, and officer
 Adam Porter (born 2002), English footballer
 Adam Posen (born 1966), American economist
 Adam Possamai (born 1970), Belgian sociologist and novelist
 Adam Józef Potocki (1822–1872), Polish politician
 Adam Powell (1496–1546), English politician
 Adam Powell (1912–1982), English cricketer
 Adam Powell (born 1976), Welsh computer programmer, game designer, and businessman
 Adam Powell (born 1981), British director and photographer
 Adam Powell (born 1987), English rugby union footballer
 Adam Clayton Powell (1865–1953), American pastor, activist, and author
 Adam Clayton Powell, Jr. (1908–1972), American politician
 Adam Clayton Powell III (born 1946), American journalist, media executive, and scholar
 Adam Clayton Powell IV (born 1962), American politician
 Adam Pragier (1886–1976), Polish economist, professor, socialist activist, politician, and writer
 Adam Prażmowski (1821–1885), Polish astronomer and astrophysicist
 Adam Prentice (born 1997), American football player
 Adam Pretty, Australian sports photographer
 Adam Pribićević (1880–1957), Croatian Serb publisher, writer, and politician
 Adam Price (born 1967), Danish screenwriter, playwright, and restaurateur 
 Adam Price (born 1968), Welsh politician
 Adam Priestley (born 1990), Gibraltarian footballer
 Adam Pritzker (born 1984), American entrepreneur
 Adam Próchnik (1892–1942), Polish socialist activist, politician, and historian
 Adam Proudlock (born 1981), English footballer
 Adam Przeworski (born 1940), Polish-American political scientist and professor
 Adam Przybek (born 2000), Welsh football goalkeeper
 Adam Ptáček (born 1980), Czech pole vaulter
 Adam Ptáčník (born 1985), Czech track cyclist
 Adam Pudil (born 2005), Czech footballer
 Adam Pugh (born 1977), American politician
 Adam Puławski, Polish historian and researcher
 Adam Purdy (born 1981), Canadian Paralympic swimmer 
 Adam Purpis (born 1883, death date unknown), Latvian Soviet spy
 Adam Purple (1930–2015), American activist and gardener
 Adam Putnam (born 1974), American politician
 Adam Puza (born 1951), Polish politician
 Adam Pynacker (1622–1673), Dutch painter

Q 

 Adam Quesnell (born 1981/1982), American stand-up comedian
 Adam Quick (born 1981), Australian basketball player
 Adam Quinlan (born 1992), Australian rugby league footballer
 Adam Quinn (born 1973), American bagpipe player, instructor, and composer

R 

 Adam Rachel (born 1976), English footballer
 Adam Radecki (born 1994), Polish footballer
 Adam Radmall (born 1984), English ice hockey player
 Adam S. Radomsky, Canadian psychologist
 Adam Radwan (born 1997), English rugby union player
 Adam Rafferty (born 1969), American guitarist and composer
 Adam Raga (born 1982), Spanish motorcycle trials racer
 Adam Ragusea (born 1982), American YouTuber and journalist
 Adam Rahayaan, Indonesian politician
 Adam Rainer (1899–1950), dwarf and giant
 Adam Rolland Rainy (1862–1911), Scottish politician
 Adam Ralegh (c. 1480–1545), English politician
 Adam Ramage (1772-1850), printing press manufacturer
 Adam Ramanauskas (born 1980), Australian rules footballer
 Adam Randell (born 2000), English footballer
 Adam Rapacki (1909–1970), Polish politician and diplomat
 Adam Raphael (born 1938), English journalist
 Adam Rapoport (born 1969), American magazine editor
 Adam Rapp (born 1968), American novelist, musician and director
 Adam Raška (born 1994), Czech ice hockey player
 Adam Raška (born 2001), Czech ice hockey player
 Adam Ratajczyk (born 2002), Polish footballer
 Adam Ravenstahl (born 1984), American politician
 Adam Ray, American comedian, actor, and YouTuber
 Adam E. Ray (1808–1865), American politician and farmer
 Adam Rayner (born 1977), English actor
 Adam Rayski (1913–2008), Franco-Polish intellectual
 Adam Reach (born 1993), English footballer
Adam Redmond (born 1993), American football player
Adam Redzik (born 1977), Polish lawyer, historian, and professor
 Adam Reed (born 1970), American voice actor, writer, director and producer
 Adam Reed (born 1975), English footballer
 Adam Reed (born 1991), English footballer, also known as Adam Tull
 Adam Reefdy (born 2004), Singaporean footballer
 Adam Reid, Canadian actor, writer, producer, and director
 Adam Reid, American writer and film director
 Adam Reideborn (born 1992), Swedish ice hockey goaltender
 Adam Remmele (1877–1951), German politician
 Adam Render (1822–1881), German-American hunter, prospector, and trader
 Adam Rennocks (born 1982), English cricketer
Adam Replogle (born 1990), American football player
Adam Resnick, American director, producer, and writer
Adam B. Resnick (born 1972), American health care entrepreneur, public speaker, author, and whistleblower
Adam Reusner (c. 1496–1575), German mystic, hymn-writer, and poet
 Adam Rex (born 1973), American illustrator and author of children's books
 Adam Reynolds (born 1990), Australian Rugby League player
 Adam Rich (1968–2023), American actor
 Adam Richard (born 1971), Australian comedian, actor, radio presenter, writer, and media personality
 Adam Richards (born 1980), American boxer
 Adam Richards, New Zealand drifting driver
 Adam Richardson (born 1974), Australian rules footballer
 Adam Riches (born 1973), English comedian
 Adam Richetti (1909–1938), American criminal and bank robber
 Adam Richman (born 1974), American actor and television personality
 Adam Richman (born 1982), American indie pop singer-songwriter
 Adam Rickitt (born 1978), English actor
 Adam Ridley (born 1942), British economist, civil servant, and banker
 Adam Riedy (born 1981), American short track speed skater
 Adam Riegler (born 1998), American actor
 Adam Ries (1492–1559), German mathematician
 Adam Riess (born 1969), American astrophysicist
 Adam Rifkin (born 1966), American film director, producer, writer and actor, sometimes credited as Rif Coogan
 Adam Riggs (born 1972), American baseball player
 Adam Riley (born 1992), English cricketer
 Adam Rippon (born 1989), American figure skater
 Adam Rita (born 1947), American gridiron football coach and general manager
 Adam Ritson (born 1976), Australian rugby league footballer
 Adam Rittenberg (born 1981), American blogger and sports journalist
 Adam Rizwee (born 1991), Maldivian actor
 Adam Ro (born 1990), Ghanaian recording artist, songwriter, lifestyle artist, social activist, artistputon, and motivator
 Adam Roarke (1937–1996), American actor and film director
 Adam Robak (born 1957), Polish fencer
 Adam Roberge (born 1997), Canadian cyclist
 Adam Roberts (born 1940), emeritus professor of international relations at Oxford University
Adam Roberts (born 1965), British academic, critic, and novelist
Adam Roberts (born 1979), American food writer and humorist also known as Amateur Gourmet
Adam Roberts (born 1984), Canadian motorcycle racer
Adam Roberts (born 1991), English footballer
Adam Robertson (ca. 1812–1882), Canadian politician
Adam Robertson, American politician, businessman, and engineer
Adam Robertson, Australian dummer for the band Magic Dirt
Adam Robinson (born 1987), English rugby league player
Adam Robinson, American educator, freelance author, and chess player
Adam M. Robinson Jr. (born 1950), American U.S. Navy vice admiral
Adam Robitel (born 1978), American film director, producer, screenwriter, and actor
Adam Robson (1928–2007), Scottish rugby union player
Adam Henry Robson (1892–1980), British educationist and Senior Officer in the Royal Air Force
Adam Rocap (1854–1892), American baseball player
Adam Rodriguez (born 1975), American actor, screenwriter and director
Adam Roffman, American film producer
Adam Rogacki (born 1976), Polish politician
Adam Keir Rodger (1855–1946), Scottish businessman and politician
Adam Rogers (born 1965), American jazz guitarist
Adam Rogers (born 1985), Canadian football player
Adam Rolland (1734–1819), Scottish judge and philanthropist
Adam Rome (born 1970), American environmental historian
Adam Ronikier (1881–1952), Polish politician
Adam Rooks (born 2000), English rugby league footballer
 Adam Rooney (born 1988), Irish footballer
 Adam Rosales (born 1983), American baseball player
 Adam Roscrow (born 1995), Welsh footballer
 Adam Rose (born 1979), South African wrestler
 Adam Rosen (born 1984), American-born British luger Olympian
 Adam Rosendale, American politician and businessman
 Adam Rosenke (born 1984), Canadian bobsledder
 Adam Ross (born 1967), American author
 Adam Ross, American guitarist, songwriter, and producer
 Adam Rossington (born 1993), English cricketer
 Adam Franciszek Ksawery Rostkowski (1660–1738), Polish Roman Catholic prelate, writer, and translator
 Adam Daniel Rotfeld (born 1938), Polish foreign minister
 Adam Rothenberg (born 1975), American actor
 Adam Rouse (born 1992), Zimbabwean-English cricketer
 Adam Rowe (born 1992), English stand-up comedian and podcaster
 Adam Rowntree (born 1989), English footballer
 Adam Roxburgh (born 1970), Scottish rugby union player and coach
 Adam Roynon (born 1988), British motorcycle speedway rider
 Adam Ruben, American writer, comedian, rapper, storyteller, science communicator, and molecular biologist
 Adam Rubin, American children's author
 Adam Ruckwood (born 1974), British swimmer
 Adam Rudden (born 1983), Irish poet
 Adam Rudolph (born 1955), American jazz composer and percussionist
 Adam Rufer (born 1991), Czech ice hockey player
 Adam Rulík (born 1996), Czech ice hockey player
 Adam Rundle (born 1984), English footballer
 Adam Rundqvist (born 1990), Swedish ice hockey player
 Adam Runnalls (born 1998), Canadian biathlete
 Adam Rusling (born 2003), English rugby league footballer
 Adam Russel (fl. 1295), English politician
 Adam Russell (born 1983), American baseball pitcher
 Adam Russell, American bassist for the band Story of the Year
 Adam Russo (born 1983), Canadian-Italian ice hockey goaltender
 Adam Rutherford (born 1975), British geneticist, author, and broadcaster
 Adam Rutter (born 1986), Australian racewalker
 Adam Ruud (born 1983), American soccer player
 Adam Ružička (born 1999), Slovak ice hockey player
 Adam Ryczkowski (born 1997), Polish footballer
 Adam Rzhevusky (1801–1888), Polish-Russian general

S 
 Adam Saad (born 1994), Australian rules footballer
 Adam Saad (born 2004), Ghanaian footballer
 Adam Saathoff (born 1975), American sport shooter
 Adam Sabra, American historian and professor
 Adam Sadler (born 1980), English football goalkeeper and coach
 Adam Sadowsky (1970–2021), American entrepreneur and actor
 Adam Sahakyan (1996–2016), Armenian Armed Forces sergeant
 Adam Saif (born 1957), Yemeni actor
 Adam Saitiev (born 1977), Russian wrestler
 Adam Hassan Sakak (born 1965), Sudanese sprinter
 Adam Saks (born 1974), Danish painter
 Adam Saldana (born 2002), American soccer player
 Adam Saleh (born 1993), American YouTuber and boxer
 Adam Saliba (born 1972), Australian rules footballer
 Adam Salky (born 1978), American television and film director
 Adam Saltsman, American video game designer, also known as Adam Atomic
 Adam Sampson (born 1960), English politician
 Adam Sanders (born 1988), American singer and songwriter
 Adam Sandler (born 1966), American film actor
 Adam Sandow, American businessman
 Adam Sandurski (born 1953), Polish wrestler
 Adam Sanford (born 1975), Dominica cricketer
 Adam Aleksander Sanguszko (1590–1653), noble of the Polish-Lithuanian Commonwealth
 Adam Stanisław Sapieha (1828–1903), Polish nobleman, landlord, and politician
 Adam Stefan Sapieha (1867–1951), Polish cardinal, prince and senator, Archbishop of Kraków
 Adam Sarafian (born 1986), American geologist and pole vaulter
 Adam Sarota (born 1988), Australian footballer
 Adam Satchell (born 1981), American politician and educator
 Adam Satke (born 1994), Czech canoeist
 Adam Savage (born 1967), American special effects designer, fabricator, actor, educator, and television personality, co-host of MythBusters
 Adam Savić (born 1986), Bosnian handball goalkeeper
 Adam Sawyer (born 1999), Australian footballer
 Adam Scaife (born 1970), British physicist
 Adam Scanlon (born 1996), American politician
 Adam Schaff (1913–2006), Polish Marxist philosopher
 Adam Schantz (1819–1879), German-American immigrant, farmer, and politician
 Adam Scharrer (1889–1948), German writer
 Adam Schefter (born 1966), American sportswriter and TV analyst
 Adam Scheier (born 1973), American football player and coach
 Adam Schein, American radio and TV sportscaster
 Adam Scheinman, American screenwriter and tennis player
 Adam Schenk (born 1992), American golfer
 Adam A. Schider (1886–19??), American politician
 Adam Schiff (born 1960), American politician
 Adam Schindler (born 1983), American mixed martial artist
 Adam Schlesinger (1967–2020), American bassist, songwriter, composer,  record producer and founding member of the band Fountains of Wayne
 Adam Schlicht, American port director
 Adam Schmitt (born 1968), American singer-songwriter
 Adam Schneider (born 1984), Australian rules footballer
 Adam Schnelting, Missouri politician
 Adam Schoenberg (born 1980), American composer
 Adam Schoenfeld, American poker player and columnist
 Adam Scholefield (born 1985), British water polo player and researcher
Adam Schreiber (born 1962), American football player
Adam Schriemer (born 1995), Canadian volleyball player
Adam Schroeder, American film producer
Adam Lewis Schroeder, Canadian novelist and short story writer
Adam Schröter (c. 1525–1572), Silesian humanist, poet, and alchemist
Adam Schubert (born 1985), Australian rugby league footballer
Adam Schultz (born 1983/1984), American photographer
 Adam Schusser (born 1991), Czech-German ice hockey player
 Adam Schwadron, American politician and businessman
 Adam Scicluna, Australian entertainer
 Adam Scime (born 1982), Canadian composer and double bassist
 Adam Scorgie, Canadian documentary film producer
 Adam Scott (1871–unknown), Scottish footballer
 Adam Scott (born 1973), American actor
 Adam Scott (born 1980), Australian golfer
 Adam Scut (fl. 1382–1401), English politician
 Adam Searle, Australian politician
 Adam Searles (born 1981), British actor
 Adam Sedbar (c. 1502–1537), Abbot of Jervaulx
 Adam Sedgwick (1785–1873), English geologist
 Adam Sedgwick (1854–1913), British zoologist and professor
 Adam Sedlák (born 1991), Czech ice hockey player
 Adam See (born 1988), Malaysian footballer
 Adam Seelig (born 1975), Canadian-American poet, playwright, director, composer, and Artistic Director
 Adam Segal, American cybersecurity expert
 Adam Selwood (born 1984), Australian rules football player
 Adam Selzer (born 1980), American author
 Adam Sender, American hedge fund manager and art collector
 Adam Senior (born 2002), English footballer
 Adam Senn (born 1984), American model
 Adam Seroczyński (born 1974), Polish sprint canoeist
 Adam Serwer (born 1982), American journalist and author
 Adam Sessler (born 1973), American video game journalist, television personality, consultant, and co-host on X-Play
 Adam Setla (born 1992), Polish footballer
 Adam Setliff (born 1969), American discus thrower
 Adam Alis Setyano (born 1993), Indonesian footballer
 Adam G. Sevani (born 1992), American actor and dancer
Adam Seward (born 1982), American football player
 Adam Seybert (1773–1825), American politician
 Adam Seymour (born 1967), English cricketer
 Adam Seymour, English guitarist and songwriter
 Adam Shabala (born 1978), American baseball player
 Adam Shaban (born 1983), Kenyan footballer
 Adam Shaheen (born 1964), British-Canadian artist, television producer, and screenwriter
 Adam Shaheen (born 1994), American football player
 Baba Adam Shahid, Muslim preacher
 Adam Shaiek (born 1989), French footballer
 Adam Shakoor (1947–2022), American lawyer, jurist, and activist
 Adam Shand (born 1962), Australian writer and journalist
 Adam Shand, New Zealand visual effects operations manager
 Adam Shankman (born 1964), American director, actor, and choreographer
 Adam Shantry (born 1982), English cricketer
 Adam Shapiro (born 1972), American businessman and activist
 Adam Shapiro, American news anchor
 Adam Shareef, Maldivian politician
 Adam Sharples (born 1954), British executive, civil servant, and economist
 Adam Shaw (born 1957), American painter
 Adam Shaw, British business journalist and presenter
 Adam Shaw, drummer for the American punk rock band Lost City Angels
 Adam Baal Shem, Polish rabbi
 Adam Sherburne, American guitarist, vocalist, and music director for the band Consolidated
 Adam Sherlip (born 1984), American ice hockey coach
 Adam Sherrill (1697–1774), European American settler
 Adam Sherwin, British journalist and media correspondent
 Adam Shields (born 1977), Australian speedway rider
 Adam Shimmons (born 1972), English cricketer
 Adam Shoalts, Canadian writer
 Adam Shoemaker (born 1957), Canadian-Australian academic and administrator
 Adam Shoenfeld (born 1974), American guitarist, songwriter, and producer
 Adam Shore, American musician and vocalist for the metal band Warrant
 Adam Shortt (1859–1931), Canadian economic historian
 Adam Shreen (born 1993), Malaysian footballer
 Adam Shukri (1910–1983), Iraqi artist and architect 
 Adam Shunk (born 1979), American high jumper
 Adam Siao Him Fa (born 2001), French figure skater
 Adam Sidlow (born 1987), English rugby league footballer
 Adam Sieff (born 1954), British music consultant and music industry executive
 Adam Siegel (born 1969), singer-songwriter, guitarist, bassist, producer, actor and graphic designer
 Adam C. Siepel (born 1972), American computational biologist
 Adam Hieronim Sieniawski (1576–1616), Polish-Lithuanian noble
 Adam Hieronim Sieniawski (1623/1624–1650), Polish noble
 Adam Silo (1674–1760), Dutch painter and author
 Adam Silver (born 1962), American businessman, lawyer, sports executive, and current commissioner of the National Basketball Association
 Adam Silvera (born 1990), American author
 Adam Simac (born 1983), Canadian volleyball player
 Adam Simmonds (born 1977), English police commissioner
 Adam Simon (born 1962), American director, producer, and screenwriter
 Ádám Simon (born 1990), Hungarian footballer
 Adam G. Simon (born 1977), American actor and screenwriter
 Adam Simpson (born 1976), Australian rules footballer
 Adam Sinagra (born 1995), Canadian football player
 Adam Sinclair (born 1977), Scottish film and television actor
 Adam Sinclair (born 1984), Indian field hockey player
 Adam Sioui (born 1982), Canadian swimmer
 Adam Sisman (born 1954), British writer, editor, and biographer
 Adam Skirving (1719–1803), Scottish songwriter
 Adam Skorek (born 1956), Polish-Canadian engineer and professor
 Adam Skórnicki (born 1976), Polish motorcycle speedway rider
 Adam Skrodzki (born 1983), Polish fencer
 Adam Skumawitz (born 1979), American soccer player, coach, and businessman
 Adam Skwarczyński (1886–1934), Polish independence activist and politician
 Adam Slater (born 1973), Australian rules footballer
 Adam Sławiński (born 1935), Polish composer
 Adam J. Slemmer (1828–1868), U.S. Army officer
 Adam Słodowy (1923–2019), Polish inventor, author, and television host
 Adam Small (1936–2016), South African writer and activist
 Adam Smalley (born 2001), British racing driver
 Adam Smarte (born 1987), Liberian footballer
 Adam Smelczyński (1930–2021), Polish trap shooter
 Adam Smethurst, English actor and writer
 Adam Smith (1723–1790), economist, philosopher, and author of The Wealth of Nations
Adam Smith (1903–1985), American swimmer
Adam Smith (1930–2014), pseudonym of American economics writer and commentator, George Goodman
Adam Smith (born 1965), American politician
Adam Smith (born 1971), English footballer and coach
Adam Smith (born 1976), Canadian ice hockey player
Adam Smith (born 1985), English footballer
Adam Smith (born 1985), English footballer 
Adam Smith (born 1990), American football player
Adam Smith (born 1991), English footballer
Adam Smith (born 1992), American basketball player
Adam Smith (born 1992), English footballer
Adam Smith, British television director
Adam Smith, American politician
Adam Smith, English doctor and YouTuber
Adam D. Smith, American computer scientist
Adam Neal Smith, American actor, musician, and film producer
Adam T. Smith, American professor and scientist
Adam Smith-Neale (born 1993), English darts player
Adam Smolarczyk (born 1994), Polish volleyball player
Adam Smoluk (born 1980), Canadian screenwriter, director, actor, community leader, and executive
Adam Smyth (born 1981), English cricketer
Adam Snow, American record producer and electronic artist
Adam Snyder (born 1982), American football player
Adam W. Snyder (1799–1842), American politician
Adam Clarke Snydor (1834–1896), American judge
Adam Sobczak (born 1989), Polish rower
Adam Levin Søbøtker (1753–1823), Danish estate owner
Adam Sobel (born 1967), American mathematician and professor 
Adam Sofronijević (born 1973), Serbian library information specialist and professor
Adam Soilleux (born 1991), English cricketer
Adam Sol, Canadian-American poet
Adam Soliman, Canadian researcher
Adam Sollitt (born 1977), English football goalkeeper
Adam Solomon (born 1963), Kenyan composer, guitarist, and singer
Adam Solski (1895–1940), Polish Army major
Adam Sopp (born 1986), British actor
Adam Sørensen (born 2000), Danish footballer
Adam Sowa (born 1957), Polish deputy chief executive of the European Defence Agency
 Adam Spencer (born 1969), Australian comedian, media personality, and radio presenter
 Adam Spencer (born 1972), Canadian curler
 Adam Spreadbury-Maher, Australian-Irish theatre artistic director, producer, and writer
 Adam Springfield (born 1982), American actor
 Adam Squire (died 1588), English churchman and academic
 Adam Stachowiak (born 1986), Polish football goalkeeper
 Adam Stachowiak (born 1989), Polish racing cyclist
 Adam Stafford (born 1982), Scottish musician, filmmaker, film writer, photographer, and broadcaster
 Adam Ståhl (born 1994), Swedish footballer
 Adam Stanger, American musician
 Adam Stankievič (1882–1949), Belarusian Roman Catholic priest, politician and writer
 Adam Stansfield (1978–2010), English footballer
 Adam Starchild (1946–2006), American financial consultant and convicted fraudster
 Adam Stark (1784–1867), English printer, bookseller, and antiquary
 Adam Starostka (born 1957), Polish sprinter
 Adam Starr (born 1973), Australian rugby league footballer
 Adam Stefanović (1832–1887), Serbian lithographer and painter
 Adam Stefanow (born 1994), Polish snooker player
 Adam Steffey (born 1965), American mandolin player
 Adam Stegerwald (1874–1945), German Catholic politician
 Adam Stein, American film director and screenwriter
 Adam Steinhardt (born 1969), Australian pole vaulter
 Adam Stejskal (born 2002), Czech football goalkeeper
 Adam Steltzner (born 1963), American NASA engineer
 Adam Stemple, American folk rock musician and author
 Adam Stenavich (born 1983), American football player and coach
 Adam Stennett (born 1972), American painter
 Adam Stephen (c. 1718–1791), Scottish-born doctor and military officer
 Adam Stephens, American guitarist, harmonicist, keyboarder, pianist, and vocalist for the duo Two Gallants
 Adam R. Steigert (born 1986), American filmmaker
 Adam Sterling (born 1983), American political scientist
 Adam Stern (born 1955), American conductor
 Adam Stern (born 1980), Canadian baseball player
 Adam Steuart (1591–1654), Scottish philosopher and controversialist
 Adam Stevens (born 1974), Australian hip hop artist, known professionally as Bias B
 Adam Stevens (born 1978), American racing crew chief
 Adam Stewart (born 1981), Jamaican businessman
 Adam Stewart (born 1987), New Zealand track cyclist
 Adam Stockhausen, American production designer
 Adam Stone, American political scientist and professor
 Adam Stonegrave (fl. 1341–1342), English Justice of the King's Bench
 Adam Storing, American politician
 Adam Storke (born 1962), American actor
 Adam Strachan (1987–2022), Scottish footballer
 Adam Straith (born 1990), Canadian footballer
 Adam Streisand (born 1963), American lawyer
 Adam Strohm (1870–1951), Swedish-American librarian
 Adam Stronach, English Christian missionary
 Adam Struzik (born 1957), Polish doctor and politician
 Adam Studziński (1911–2008), Polish Roman Catholic priest
 Adam J. Sullivan, American politician
 Adam Sulzdorf-Liszkiewicz, American game designer and educator
 Adam Summerfield (born 1990), English ice hockey goaltender
 Adam Sušac (born 1989), Croatian footballer
 Adam Svensson (born 1993), Canadian golfer
 Adam Svoboda (1978–2019), Czech ice hockey goaltender and coach
 Adam Swandi (born 1996), Singaporean footballer
 Adam Sweeting, British rock critic and writer
 Adam Swift (born 1961), British political philosopher and sociologist
 Adam Swift (born 1993), English rugby league footballer
 Adam James Syddall (born 1980), English cricketer
 Adam Sýkora (born 2004), Slovak ice hockey player
 Adam P. Symson (born 1974), American businessman, CEO and president of the E. W. Scripps Company
 Ádám Szabó (footballer) (born 1988), Hungarian footballer
 Adam Szal (born 1953), Polish Roman Catholic bishop
 Ádám Szalai (born 1987), Hungarian footballer
 Adam Szejnfeld (born 1958), Polish politician
 Adam Szelągowski (1873–1961), Polish historian, teacher, and professor
 Adam Szentpétery (born 1956), Hungarian artist and professor
 Adam Szłapka (born 1984), Polish politician and political scientist
 Adam Szostkiewicz (born 1952), Polish author, religious commentator, political commentator, journalist, and translator
 Adam Sztaba (born 1975), Polish composer, music producer, conductor, arranger, pianist, and television personality
 Adam Sztykiel (born 1978), American television and film producer and screenwriter
 Adam Szubin, American politician and lawyer
 Adam Szustak (born 1978), Polish Roman Catholic priest, Dominican, itinerant preacher, academic chaplain, vlogger, and author
 Adam Szymański (1852–1916), Polish writer and lawyer
 Adam Szymczyk (born 1970), Polish art critic, curator, writer, and editor

T 

 Adam Taaso, South African bishop
 Adam Tafralis (born 1983), American football player
 Adam Taggart (born 1993), Australian footballer
 Adam Taliaferro (born 1982), American politician and football player
 Adam Tambellini (born 1994), Canadian ice hockey player
 Adam Tandy, British television producer and director
 Adam Tangata (born 1991), Cook Islands rugby league footballer
 Adam Tann (born 1982), English footballer
 Adam Tanner (1572–1632), Austrian Jesuit theologian
 Adam Tanner (born 1973), English footballer
 Adam Tarnowski (1866–1946), Austro-Hungarian and Polish diplomat
 Adam Tarnowski (1892–1956), Austro-Hungarian and Polish diplomat and minister
 Adam Tarło (1713–1744), Polish nobleman
 Adam Tas (1668–1722), Dutch community leader
 Adam Tas (born 1981), South African singer and songwriter
 Adam Taub, American documentary film director
 Adam Taubitz (born 1967), German jazz and classical musician
 Adam Taylor (born 1991), Australian tennis player
 Adam Taylor, American composer
 Adam Russell Taylor, American human rights activist and minister
 Adam Tedder, British actor, singer-songwriter, and multi-instrumentalist musician
 Adam Tensta (born 1983), Swedish rapper, born Adam Momodou Eriksson Taal
 Adam Tepsurgayev (1976–2000), Chechen freelance cameraman
Adam Terry (born 1982), American football player
 Adam Teuto, 14th-century German writer
 Adam Thibault (born 1990), Canadian football player
 Adam Christian Thebesius (1686–1732), German anatomist
Adam Thielen (born 1990), American football player
Adam Thirlwell (born 1978), British novelist
Adam Thom (1802–1890), Scottish teacher, journalist, lawyer, public servant, and recorder
Adam Thomas (born 1986), Welsh rugby union player
 Adam Thomas (born 1988), British actor
 Adam Thomas (born 1992), New Zealand footballer
 Adam Thomas, American politician
 Adam Thompson (born 1982), New Zealand tennis player
 Adam Thompson (born 1992), English footballer
 Adam David Thompson, American actor
 Adam Thompstone (born 1987), English rugby union player
 Adam Thomson (born 1955), British diplomat
 Adam Thomson (born 1982), New Zealand rugby union player
 Adam Thomson (born 1986), Australian rules footballer
 Adam Bruce Thomson (1885–1976), Scottish painter
 Adam S. T. Thomson (1908–2000), Scottish engineer and university administrator
 Adam Thorn (born 1979), American musician and songwriter
 Adam Thoroughgood (1604–1640), English colonist and community leader in the Virginia Colony
 Adam Thorpe (born 1956), British poet and novelist
 Adam Thoseby (born 1991), British-Australian basketball player
 Adam Throop (born 1977), American soccer player
 Adam Tickell (born 1965), British economic geographer
 Adam Tihany (born 1948), Romanian-American hospitality designer
 Adam Tilander (born 1998), Swedish ice hockey player
 Adam Tillcock (born 1993), English cricketer
Adam Timmerman (born 1971), American football player
Adam Tinley (born 1967), English DJ, musician, singer, and record producer, known professionally as Adamski
Adam Tinworth (born 1971), English journalist, writer, and role-playing game designer
Adam Tippett (born 1979), Australian rugby league footballer
Adam Tokarz (1944–2014), Polish footballer
 Adam Toledo (2007/2008–2021), Mexican-American boy fatally shot by police
 Adam Tomasiak (born 1953), Polish rower
 Adam Tomkins (born 1969), British academic and politician
 Adam Tomlinson (born 1993), Australian rules footballer
 Adam Tooze (born 1967), English historian and professor
 Adam Topolski (born 1951), Polish footballer
 Adam Torrence (1732–1780), Irish-American businessman and soldier
 Adam Torres, American singer and songwriter
 Adam Johan Frederik Poulsen Trampe (1798–1876), Dano-Norwegian lawyer and politician
 Adam Trautman (born 1997), American football player
 Adam Treloar (born 1993), Australian rules footballer
 Adam Trenčan (born 1990), Slovak ice hockey goaltender
Adam Treu (born 1974), American football player
 Adam von Trott zu Solz (1909–1944), German lawyer and diplomat who opposed the Nazi regime
 Adam Trupish (born 1979), Canadian boxer
 Adam Tse (born 1990), Hong Kong footballer
 Adam Tsekhman, Canadian actor
 Adam Tsuei (born 1959), Chinese entrepreneur, film producer, and director
 Adam Tučný (born 2002), Slovak footballer
 Adam Tuominen (born 1980), Australian actor
 Adam Tutbury (died ca. 1400), English politician and merchant
 Adam Tyc (born 1986), Czech sport shooter
 Adam Tzanetopoulos (born 1995), Greek footballer

U 
 Adam Ulam (1922–2000), Polish-American historian and political scientist
 Adam Ulatoski (born 1985), American football player
 Adam Heinrich Wilhelm Uloth (1804–1885), German politician

V 

 Adam Václavík (born 1994), Czech biathlete
 Adam Valdez, American visual effects supervisor
 Adam van Breen (1585–1642), Dutch painter
 Adam Frans van der Meulen (1632–1690), Flemish painter and draughtsman
 Adam van Dommele (born 1984), Australian footballer
 Adam Van Doren, American watercolorist, author, and documentary filmmaker
 Adam van Düren, German sculptor and architect
 Adam van Koeverden (born 1982), Canadian sprint kayaker and politician
 Adam van Noort (1561/1962–1641), Flemish painter, draughtsman, and teacher
 Adam van Vianen (1568–1627), Dutch silversmith, engraver, and medalist
 Adam VanHo, American lawyer
 Adam Varadi (born 1985), Czech footballer
 Adam Vaughan (born c. 1961), Canadian political journalist and politician
 Adam Vayer (born 1987), Israeli footballer
 Adam Swart Vedder (1834–1905), Canadian politician and rancher
 Adam S. Veige, American chemist and professor
 Adam Vella (born 1971), Australian sport shooter
 Adam Vetulani (1901–1976), Polish historian of medieval law
 Adam Veyde (1667–1720), Russian infantry general
 Adam Vidjeskog (born 1998), Finnish footballer
 Adam Viktora (born 1996), Czech swimmer
 Adam Vinatieri (born 1972), American football player
 Adam Virgo (born 1983), English footballer
 Adam Vishnyakov (born 1991), Russian footballer
 Adam Vlkanova (born 1994), Czech footballer
 Adam Voges (born 1979), Australian cricketer
 Adam Vojtěch (born 1986), Czech politician and lawyer
 Adam von Bodenstein (1528–1577), Swiss Paracelsian alchemist and physician
 Adam von Trautmannsdorf (1579–1617), Croatian and Austrian Littoral general
 Adam von Trott zu Solz (1909–1944), German lawyer and diplomat
 Adam Georg von Agthe (1777–1826), Russian Imperial Russian Army Major General
 Adam Karl August von Eschenmayer (1768–1852), German philosopher and physician
 Adam Abraham von Gaffron und Oberstradam (1665–1738), Silesian nobleman, officer of the Danish army
 Adam Gottlob von Krogh (1768–1839), Norwegian-Danish military officer
 Adam Johann von Krusenstern (1770–1846), Baltic-German admiral and explorer
 Adam Friedrich von Seinsheim (1708–1779), Prince-Bishop of Würzburg and Prince-Bishop of Bamberg
 Adam Heinrich von Steinau (died 1712), Saxon Generalfeldmarschall
 Adam Edward Vrooman (1847–1923), Canadian physician and politician

W 

 Adam Waczyński (born 1989), Polish basketball player
 Adam Wade (1935–2022), American singer, musician, and actor
 Adam Wade (born 1968), American drummer
 Adam Wade, American storyteller
 Adam Wadecki (born 1977), Polish racing cyclist
 Adam Wagner, British lawyer and politician
 Adam C. Wagner (1858/1860–1935), American architect and engineer
 Adam Willis Wagnalls (1843–1924), American dictionary publisher
 Adam Wainwright (born 1981), American baseball player
 Adam Wakeman (born 1974), English keyboard player
 Adam Wakenshaw (1914–1942), English recipient of the Victoria Cross
 Adam Walczak (born 1957), Polish footballer
 Adam Walinsky (born 1937), American lawyer and politician
 Adam Walker (1829–1902), Australian politician
Adam Walker (born 1963), American football player
Adam Walker (born 1968), American football player
Adam Walker (born 1969), British politician
Adam Walker (born 1986), Scottish ice hockey player and coach
 Adam Walker (born 1987), English flautist
 Adam Walker (1991–2022), Scottish rugby league player
 Adam Walker (born 1991), English footballer
 Adam Walker, Canadian politician
 Adam Wallace (born 1981), English footballer
 Adam Wallace-Harrison (born 1979), Australian rugby union player
 Adam Walne (born 1990), English rugby league footballer
 Adam Walsh (1974–1981), American murder victim
 Adam Walsh (American football) (1901–1985), American football player and coach
 Adam Walters, Australian journalist
 Adam Walton (born 1971), British radio disc jockey
 Adam WarRock (born 1980), American rapper, born as Eugene K. Ahn
 Adam Ward (born 1986), American baseball player and coach
 Adam Ward (1988–2015), American murder victim
 Adam Kelly Ward (1982–2016), American convicted murderer executed by lethal injection
 Adam Warren (born 1967), American comic book writer and artist
 Adam Warren (born 1975), English cricketer
 Adam Warren (born 1987), American baseball pitcher
 Adam Warren (born 1991), Welsh rugby union player
 Adam Warwick (born 1977), Australian rugby league footballer
 Adam Waszkiewicz (born 1993), Polish footballer
 Adam Watene (1977–2008), Cook Islands rugby league footballer
 Adam Watson (1914–2007), British International relations theorist and researcher
 Adam Watson (1930–2019), Scottish biologist, ecologist, and mountaineer
 Adam Watt (born 1967), Australian boxer and kickboxer
 Adam Watts (born 1975), American singer-songwriter
 Adam Watts (born 1988), English footballer
 Adam Wawrosz (1913–1971), Polish poet, writer, and activist
 Adam Ważyk (1905–1982), Polish poet, essayist, and writer
Adam Weber (born 1987), American football player
Adam Webster (born 1980), English footballer
Adam Webster (born 1995), English footballer
Adam Ditlev Wedell-Wedellsborg (1782–1827), Dano-Norwegian politician
Adam Gottlieb Weigen (1677–1727), German pietist, theologian, and animal rights writer
Adam Weiler (died 1894), German trade unionist and socialist activist
Adam D. Weinberg, American museum curator and director
Adam S. Weinberg (born 1965), American sociologist, academic administrator, and businessman
Adam Weiner (born 1975), Polish handball goalkeeper
 Adam Weishaupt (1748–1830), founder of the Order of Illuminati
 Adam Weisman (born 1986), American actor and mortician
 Adam Weiss, Slovenian politician
 Adam Weissel (1854–1928), American U.S. Navy sailor and Medal of Honor recipient
 Adam Weissman, American television director
 Adam Weisweiler (c. 1750– after 1810), French cabinetmaker
 Adam Weitsman, American entrepreneur and businessman
 Adam Cleghorn Welch (1864–1943), Scottish clergyman and biblical scholar
 Adam Wenceslaus, Duke of Cieszyn (1574–1617), Duke of Cieszyn
 Adam Werbach (born 1973), American environmental activist, author, and entrepreneur
 Adam Werner (born 1997), Swedish ice hockey goaltender
 Adam Werritty (born 1978), Scottish businessman
 Adam West (1928–2017), American television actor
 Adam West (born 1986), American soccer player
 Adam Wexler (born 1956), American-Israeli musician
 Adam Wharton (born 2004), English footballer
 Adam Wheater (born 1990), English cricketer
 Adam Wheeler (born 1980), Australian rugby league footballer
 Adam Wheeler (born 1981), American wrestler
 Adam White (c. 1630–1708), Scottish Presbyterian minister
 Adam White (1817–1878), Scottish zoologist
 Adam White (1823–1895), Swiss-American soldier and Medal of Honor recipient
 Adam White (born 1976), Australian rules footballer and filmmaker
 Adam White (born 1989), Australian volleyball player
 Adam Whitehead (born 1980), British swimmer
 Adam Whitelock (born 1987), New Zealand rugby union footballer
 Adam Bergmark Wiberg (born 1997), Swedish footballer
 Adam Wicheard (born 1985), English snooker player
 Adam Wickmer (died 1384), English priest and academic
 Adam Wieczorek (born 1992), Polish mixed martial artist
 Adam Wielomski (born 1972), Polish scientist and professor 
 Adam Wiercioch (born 1980), Polish fencer
 Adam Wierman (born 1979), American computer scientist and professor
 Adam Wilcox (born 1976), British racing driver
 Adam Wilcox (born 1992), American ice hockey goaltender
 Adam Wildavsky (born 1960), American bridge player
 Adam Wilde (born 1979), English footballer
 Adam Wilk (born 1987), American baseball pitcher
 Adam Wilk (born 1997), Polish footballer
 Adam Willaerts (1577–1664), Dutch painter
 Adam Willard (born 1973), American drummer, known by the stage name Atom Willard
 Adam Willett (born 1982), American boxer
 Adam Williams (1922–2006), American film and TV actor, born Adam Berg
 Adam Williams (born 1983), British basketball player
 Adam Williams, American baseball player
 Adam Williamson (born 1984), American soccer man
 Adam Willis (born 1976), English footballer
 Adam Willits (born 1972), Australian actor
 Adam Wilsby (born 2000), Swedish ice hockey player
 Adam Wilson (1814–1891), Canadian lawyer, judge, and politician
 Adam Wilson, British bassist for the post-Britpop band Thirteen Senses
 Adam Wiltzie (born 1969), American-Belgian composer and sound engineer 
 Adam Wingard (born 1982), American film director, editor, cinematographer, and writer
 Adam Winkler (born 1967), American lawyer and professor
 Adam Winsler, American developmental psychologist
 Adam Wise (1943–2008), English Royal Air Force pilot
 Adam Wishart (born 1969), British documentary filmmaker
 Adam Wiśniewski (born 1980), Polish handballer
 Adam Wiśniewski-Snerg (1937–1995), Polish author
 Adam Wiśniowiecki (c. 1566–1622), Polish-Lithuanian nobleman
 Adam Włodek (1922–1986), Polish poet, editor, and translator
 Adam Wodnicki (1930–2020), Polish professor, writer, and translator
 Adam Wojciechowski (born 1980), Polish rower
 Adam Wójcik (1970–2017), Polish basketball player
 Adam Wolanin (1919–1987), Polish-American soccer player
 Adam Wolańczyk (1936–2022), Polish actor
 Adam Wolff (1899–1984), Polish historian and sailor
 Adam Wolniewicz (born 1993), Polish footballer
 Adam Wong (born 1985), Canadian gymnast
 Adam Wonus, American real estate developer
 Adam Wood (born 1955), British diplomat and politician
 Adam Woodbury (born 1994), American basketball player
 Adam Woodward, British actor and model
 Adam Woodyatt (born 1968), English actor
 Adam Wool, American politician
 Adam T. Woolley, American chemist and professor
 Adam Woolnough (born 1982), Australian rugby league footballer
 Adam Woronowicz (born 1973), Polish actor
 Adam Worth (1844–1902), German-born American bank robber and mob boss
 Adam Woźnica (born 1994), Polish volleyball player
 Adam Wright (1975–1998), Australian rugby league footballer
 Adam Wright (born 1977), American water polo player
 Adam Wurtzel (born 1985), American television personality, host, and producer
 Adam Wybe (1584–1653), Dutch engineer and inventor
 Adam Wylie (born 1984), American actor and singer
 Adam Wysocki (born 1974), Polish sprint canoeist

Y 

 Adam Yacenda (1915–1986), American newspaper publisher and political advisor
 Adam Yamaguchi, American television journalist and producer
 Adam Yarmolinsky (1922–2000), American academic, educator, and author
 Adam Yates (born 1983), English footballer
 Adam Yates (born 1992), English racing cyclist
 Adam Yauch (1964–2012), American rapper and member of the Beastie Boys, known professionally as MCA
 Adam Baako Nortey Yeboah (born 1950), Ghanaian politician and manager
 Adam J. Yeend (born 1980), Australian actor and producer
 Adam Yosef (born 1981), British multimedia journalist, photojournalist, and community activist
 Adam Young (born 1982), American politician
 Adam Young, American singer-songwriter and member of the electronic project Owl City

Z 

 Adam Ignacy Zabellewicz (1784–1831), Polish professor
 Adam Zagajewski (1945–2021), Polish poet, novelist, translator and essayist
 Adam Zajíček (born 1993), Czech volleyball player
 Adam Zalužanský ze Zalužan (c. 1555–1613), Czech-Bohemian botanist, physician, and professor
 Adam Zameenzad (1937–2017), Pakistani-British writer
 Adam Zamenhof (1888–1940), Polish doctor, Holocaust victim
 Adam Zamoyski (born 1949), English historian
 Adam Žampa (born 1990), Slovakian alpine ski racer
 Adam Zampa (born 1992), Australian cricketer
 Adam A. Zango (born 1985), Nigerian actor, singer, dancer, scriptwriter, director, film producer, television personality, and philanthropist
Adam Zaruba (born 1991), Canadian football player
Adam Zavacký (born 1988), Slovak sprinter
Adam Zawislak, Polish Paralympic volleyball player
Adam Zbar (born 1969), American entrepreneur
Adam Zbořil (born 1995), Czech ice hockey player
Adam Zeis (born 1978), American writer and podcaster
Adam Zejer (born 1963), Polish footballer
Adam Zeman (born 1991), Czech ice hockey player
Adam Zemke (born 1983), American politician
Adam Zertal (1936–2015), Israeli archaeologist and professor
Adam Zimarino (born 2001), Australian footballer
Adam Zimmer (born 1984), American football coach
Adam Zimmerman (1852–1919), Canadian politician
Adam Zindani (born 1972), English rhythm guitarist
Adam Zolotin (born 1983), American actor
Adam Zotovich, American stage performer and producer
Adam Zreľák (born 1994), Slovak footballer
 Adam Zrinski (1662–1691), Croatian count and army officer
 Adam Zucker (born 1976), American sportscaster
 Adam Friedrich Zürner (1679–1742), German cartographer and geographer
 Adam Zwar (born 1972), Australian actor, voice actor, and writer
 Adam Zyglis (born 1982), American cartoonist

Fictional characters
 Adam, a character in Barney and the Backyard Gang
 Adam, a character in the 2008 British slasher film Eden Lake
 Adam, a character in the film Only Lovers Left Alive
 Adam, a character in the TV series Traffic Light
 Adam, a powerful vampire and antagonist of the 2012 film Abraham Lincoln: Vampire Hunter
 Adam, a character in Buffy the Vampire Slayer
 Adam, an angel in Neon Genesis Evangelion
 Adam, a character in the British soap opera Hollyoaks
 Adam, a character in the American television series Northern Exposure
 Adam, a character in Dungeons & Dragons Ravenloft campaign setting
 Black Adam, born Teth-Adam, a supervillain and occasional antihero from DC Comics
 Prince Adam, the alter ego of He-Man in the animated TV series
 Prince Adam, the Beast's true human form in Disney's 1991 animated and 2017 live-action films
 Adam Adamant, title character of the British TV series Adam Adamant Lives!
 Adam Alexander, character on the American soap opera The Bold and the Beautiful
 Adam Baker, character in the 1978 American television film The Users
 Adam Barlow, character on the British soap opera Coronation Street
 Adam Barton, on the British soap opera
 Adam Bede, title character of George Eliot's 1859 novel, Adam Bede
 Adam Beecher, title character of the 1970 film Adam's Woman
 Adam Bernstein, one of the title characters of Adam & Steve
 Adam Best, on the British soap opera EastEnders
 Adam Blake, secret identity of the DC Comics superhero, Captain Comet
 Adam Bomb, titular character of the internet comic strip of the same name
 Adam Bomb, name of a card in the Garbage Pail Kids trading cards
 Adam Bonner, character played by Spencer Tracy in the 1949 film Adam's Rib
 Adam Brady, on the New Zealand soap opera Shortland Street
 Adam Brashear, aka Blue Marvel, from Marvel Comics
 Adam Braverman, in the TV series Parenthood
 Adam Cadman, in the comic Mazeworld
 Adam Cameron, character from the Australian soap opera Home and Away
 Adam Carrington, on the television show Dynasty
 Adam Carter, from the BBC TV espionage show Spooks
 Adam Cartwright, on the American TV show Bonanza
 Adam Chandler, on the American soap opera All My Children
 Adam Cook, character in the 1951 American film An American in Paris
 Adam Cooper, on the Australian police drama series Blue Heelers
 Adam Dalgliesh, protagonist of mystery novels by P. D. James
 Adam Davenport, a main character in the Disney XD series Lab Rats
 Adam Drake, long running character in the crime/mystery serial The Edge of Night
 Adam Eddington, major character in multiple novels by Madeleine L'Engle
 Adam Fitzgerald, character on the Australian soap opera Neighbours
 Adam Forsythe, character on the British soap opera Emmerdale
 Adam Frost, character in the American television show The Leftovers
 Adam Gibson, the main character in the 2000 film The 6th Day
 Adam Heywood, character on the New Zealand soap opera Shortland Street
 Adam Jensen, the main character of the video game Deus Ex: Human Revolution
 Adam Jones, the main character in the 2015 film Burnt
 Adam Jones, in the Canadian TV series Between
 Adam Kane, one of the main characters in Mutant X
 Adam Kaufman, in the American television show 24
 Adam Kendall, in the American television show Little House on the Prairie
 Adam Kendall, in the American television show Friday Night Lights
 Adam Kieslowski, in the Swedish TV series Eva & Adam
 Adam Lang, a fictional character in the Robert Harris novel The Ghost and its film adaptation.
 Adam Levy, lead character in the 2008 film Adam's Wall
 Adam Link, humanoid robot in the short stories of Eando Binder
 Adam Maitland, in the 1988 American fantasy comedy film Beetlejuice
 Adam Malkovich, a fictional character in the Metroid franchise
 Adam Meiks/Fenton Meiks, in the 2001 psychological horror film Frailty
 Adam Miller, on the Australian soap opera Neighbours
 Adam Mitchell, from Doctor Who
 Adam Monroe, antagonist in Heroes
 Adam Morgan, in the British soap opera Hollyoaks
 Adam Munson, in the American soap opera As the World Turns
 Adam Newman, in the American soap opera The Young and the Restless
 Adam Newman, title character of the comic strip Adam@home
 Adam Park, the second Black Ranger in the Power Rangers franchise
 Adam Pedersen, title character of the 2005 film Adam's Apples
 Adam Powell, in the American sitcom television series Charles in Charge
 Adam Raki, title character in the 2009 film Adam
 Adam Rhodes, on the American TV show Rules of Engagement
 Adam Rhodes, character in the Australian soap opera Neighbours
 Adam Ross, a main character in CSI: NY
 Adam Ruzek, a main character in Chicago P.D.
 Adam Sackler, character played by Adam Driver in the HBO series Girls
 Adam Schiff, on the American TV show Law & Order
 Adam Sharpe, on the Australian soap opera Home and Away
 Adam Smasher, in the video game Cyberpunk 2077
 Adam Smith, title character of the British drama series, Adam Smith
 Adam Smith, character on the British soap opera, EastEnders
 Adam Smith, title character of the "Adam" episode of the British TV show Torchwood
 Adam Stanheight, in the Saw franchise
 Adam Stein, title character of the film Adam Resurrected
 Adam Stephens, character in the American television show Bewitched
 Adam Stevens, character on the Australian soap opera Neighbours 
 Adam Strange, DC Comics superhero
 Adam Susan, main antagonist in the comic and graphic novel series V for Vendetta
 Adam Sutekh, in the Lorien Legacies series by Pittacus Lore.
 Adam Svenson, also known as Captain Blue, a main character in the Captain Scarlet and the Mysterons TV series
 Adam Szalinski, in Honey, I Blew Up the Kid and Honey, We Shrunk Ourselves
 Adam Tate, in the Australian soap opera Sons and Daughters
 Adam Taurus, a major antagonist in the animated web series RWBY.
 Adam Torres, fictional character in Degrassi: The Next Generation
 Adam Trueman, on British TV show Casualty
 Adam Venture, central character of the adventure game Adam's Venture
 Adam Warlock, a Marvel Comics character
 Adam West, character in the American animated television series Family Guy, voiced by Adam West
 Adam White, character on the British soap opera EastEnders
 Adam Willis, on the Australian soap opera Neighbours
 Adam X, a Marvel Comics character
 Adam Young, fictional character in the film Mr. Young

See also
 
 Adem, given name
 Adam (surname)

References

Masculine given names
Hebrew masculine given names
Russian masculine given names
Ukrainian masculine given names
Romanian masculine given names
Bulgarian masculine given names
Polish masculine given names
Czech masculine given names
Slovak masculine given names
Serbian masculine given names
Slovene masculine given names
Croatian masculine given names
English masculine given names
Irish masculine given names
Scottish masculine given names
French masculine given names
German masculine given names
Dutch masculine given names
Norwegian masculine given names
Swedish masculine given names
Finnish masculine given names
Danish masculine given names
Icelandic masculine given names
Modern names of Hebrew origin